= GeoSpy =

- First played: 2013-12-11, Czech Republic

Characteristics
- Team members: Optional
- Type: Outdoor Recreation Activity
- Equipment: GPS receiver or GPS-enabled mobile device, Camera
- Venue: Worldwide

Presence
- Obsolete: Yes

GeoSpy was an outdoor recreational activity which combines geographic locations and maps with photography in a location-based game. To play the game requires a camera and a mobile Global Positioning System (GPS) device.

There are several goals in the game, but the primary one is to find and create objects through pictures of objects and places which are uploaded to the game's website.

To create an object the participant requires complete knowledge about the object, and the GPS coordinates and photos of the object that the participant has taken. Similarly, existing objects can be secured by visiting and photographing the object and posting the photo on the game’s website as proof that the competitor visited the object. The objects are divided into different categories namely Civil, Religious & Historical, Natural, Technical and Military objects with further sub-categories such as hospitals, museums, factories, memorials, etc.

Participants in the game are called spies.

== See also ==
- Augmented reality
- Benchmarking (geolocating)
- Encounter (game)
- Geocaching
- Geohashing
- Location-based game
- Munzee
- Orienteering
- Puzzlehunt
- Questing
- Transmitter hunting
- Waymarking
