= Ammunition box =

Container designed for safe transport and storage of ammunition

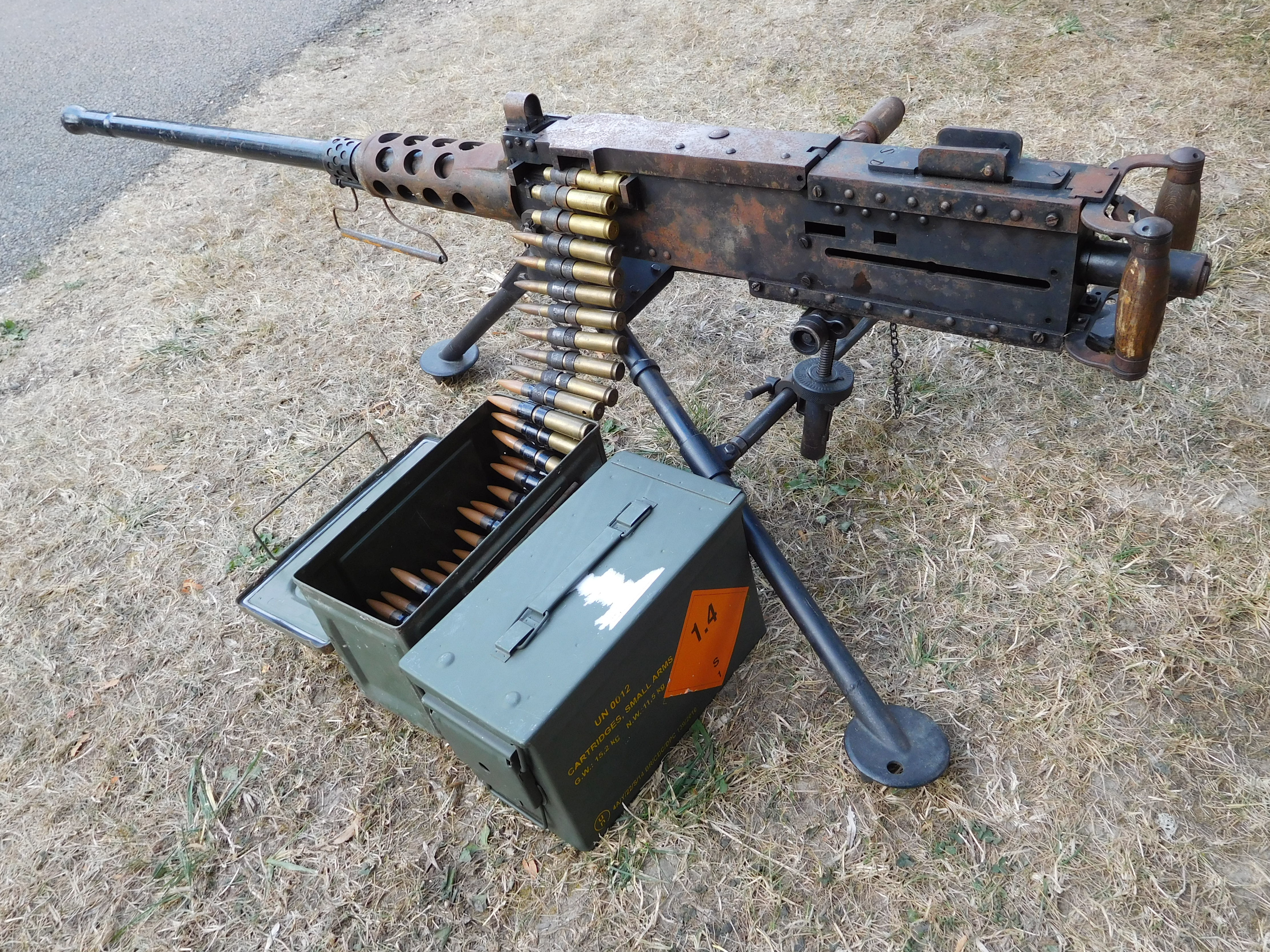
M2 Browning with metal ammunition box

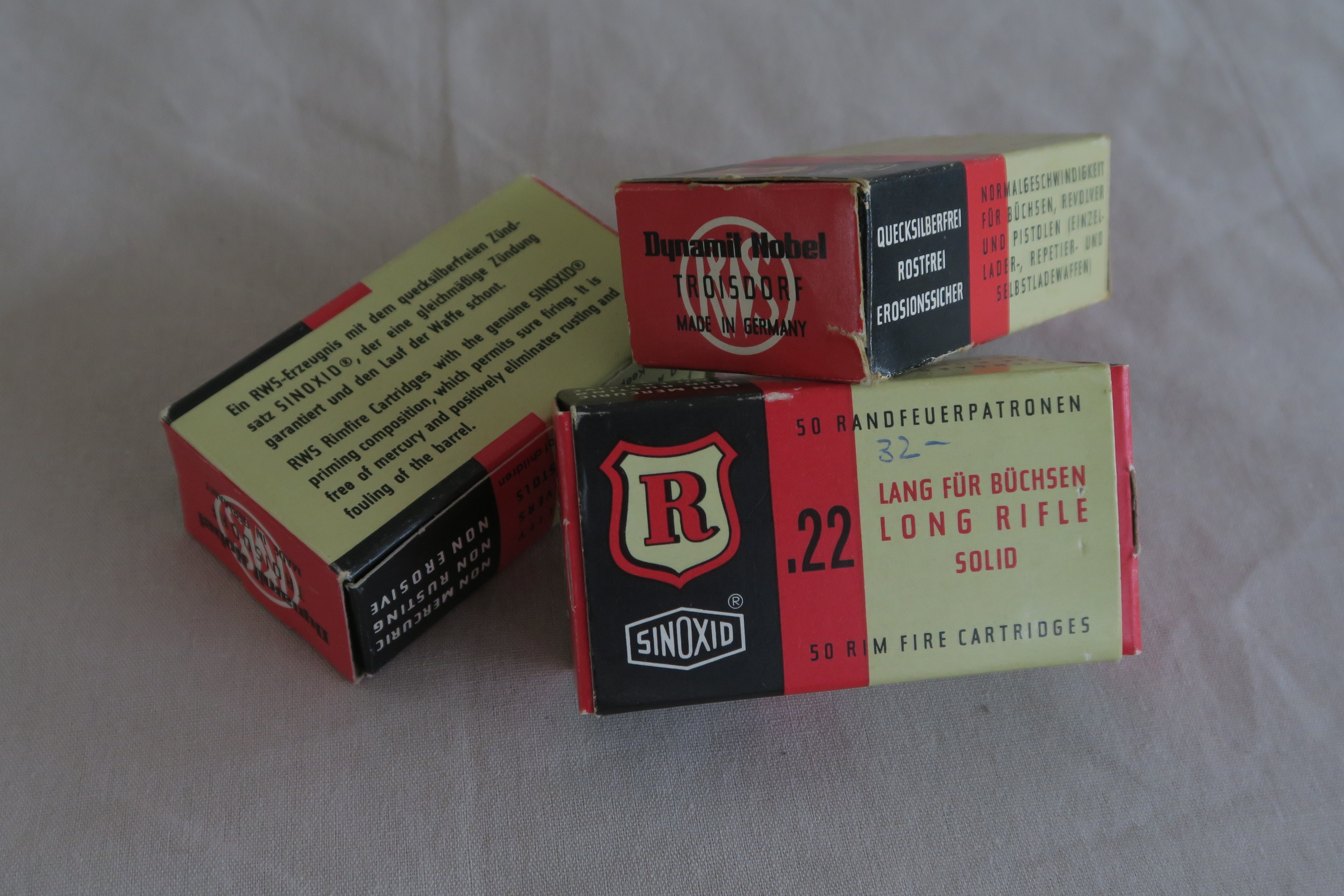
Paperboard boxes of .22 rifle ammunition

An ammunition box or cartridge box is a container designed for safe transport and storage of ammunition. It is typically made of metal, wood, or corrugated fiberboard. Boxes are labelled with caliber, quantity, manufacturing date, lot number, and UN dangerous goods labels.

With a metal container, a rubber gasket is commonly found in the hinged lid to protect the ammunition from moisture damage. With other containers, plastic bags and desiccants can be used.

The resealing ammunition box is largely a NATO tradition. Warsaw Pact nations typically stored and transported ammunition in single-use "spam cans". They had crates that had a sealed zinc lining on the inside.

== Commercial ammunition boxes ==
Some enthusiasts and investors collect historical ammunition boxes.

Many also use them as containers for the recreational activity of Geocaching.

== Storage ==
Due to their durable construction, used metal ammunition boxes are popularly re-used for general storage and other purposes. They are a popular choice for geocaching containers. Used ammunition boxes have lead and propellant residue inside, so they should not be used to store food or drink. Commercially-made new or fully reconditioned used boxes do not have this problem. Used boxes are often sold at military surplus stores.

== Regulations ==
Shipments of explosives and similar hazards are highly regulated. Based on the UN Recommendations on the Transport of Dangerous Goods model regulations, each country has coordinated design and performance requirements for shipment. For example, in the US, the Department of Transportation has jurisdiction and published requirements in Title 49 of the Code of Federal Regulations.

The applicable regulation depends on the level of hazard, quantity being shipped, mode of transit, etc.

== Gallery ==
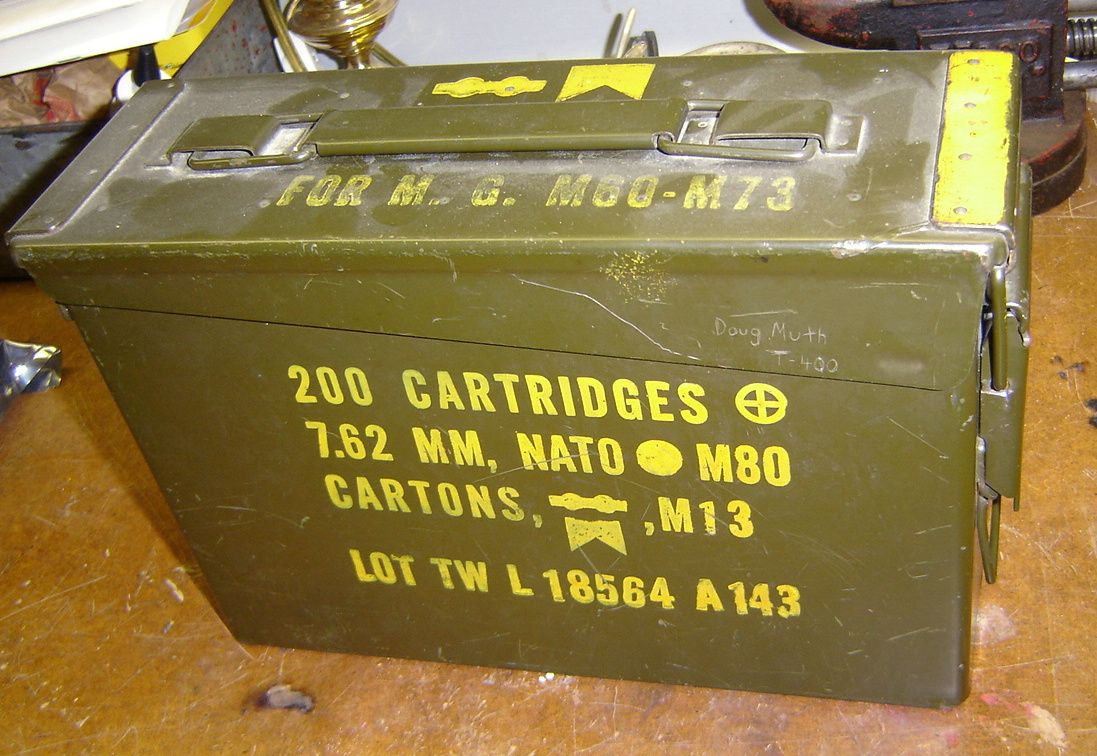
An M19A1 ammunition box for 7.62×51mm NATO M80 ball

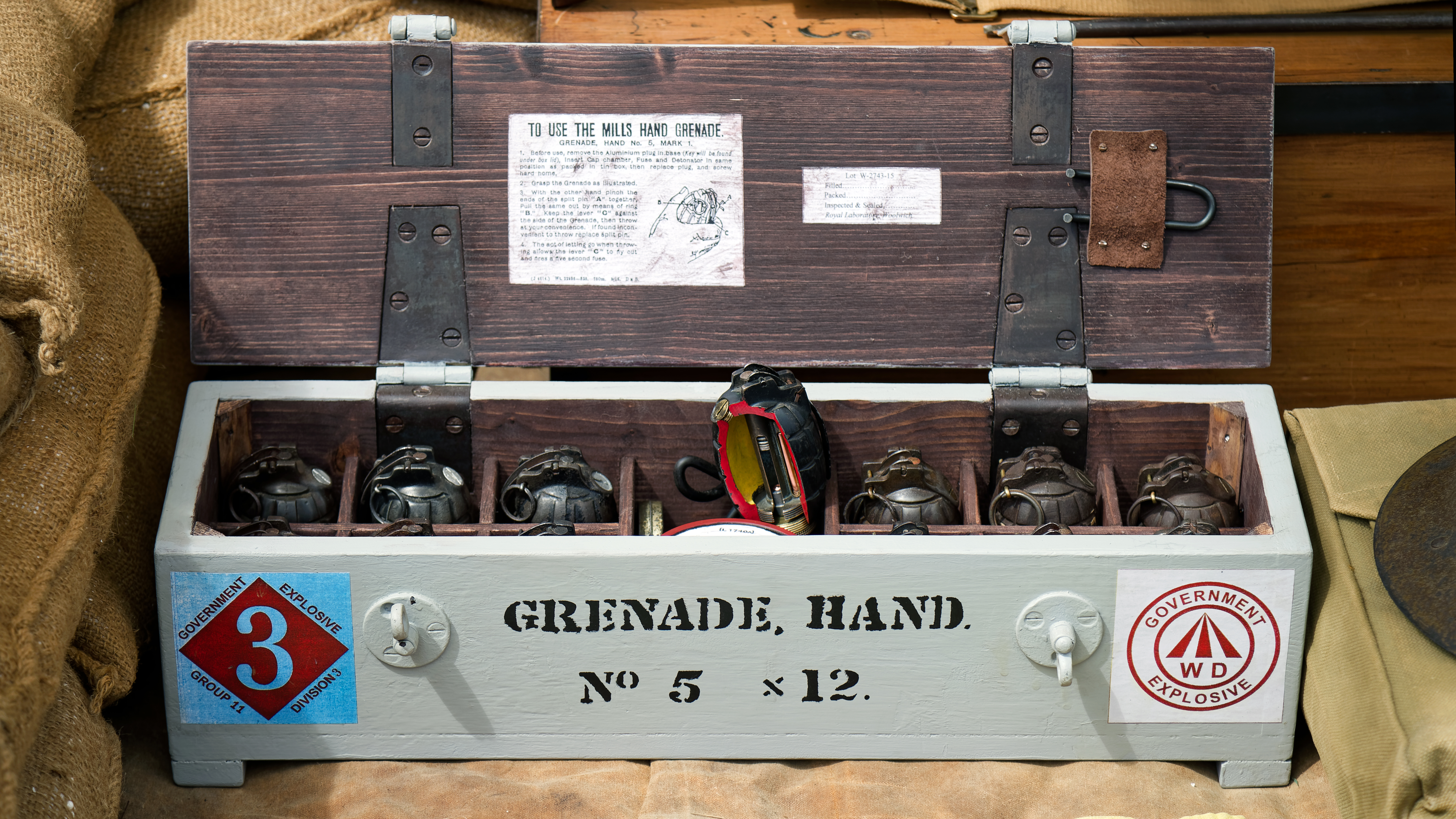
WW II English hand grenade box

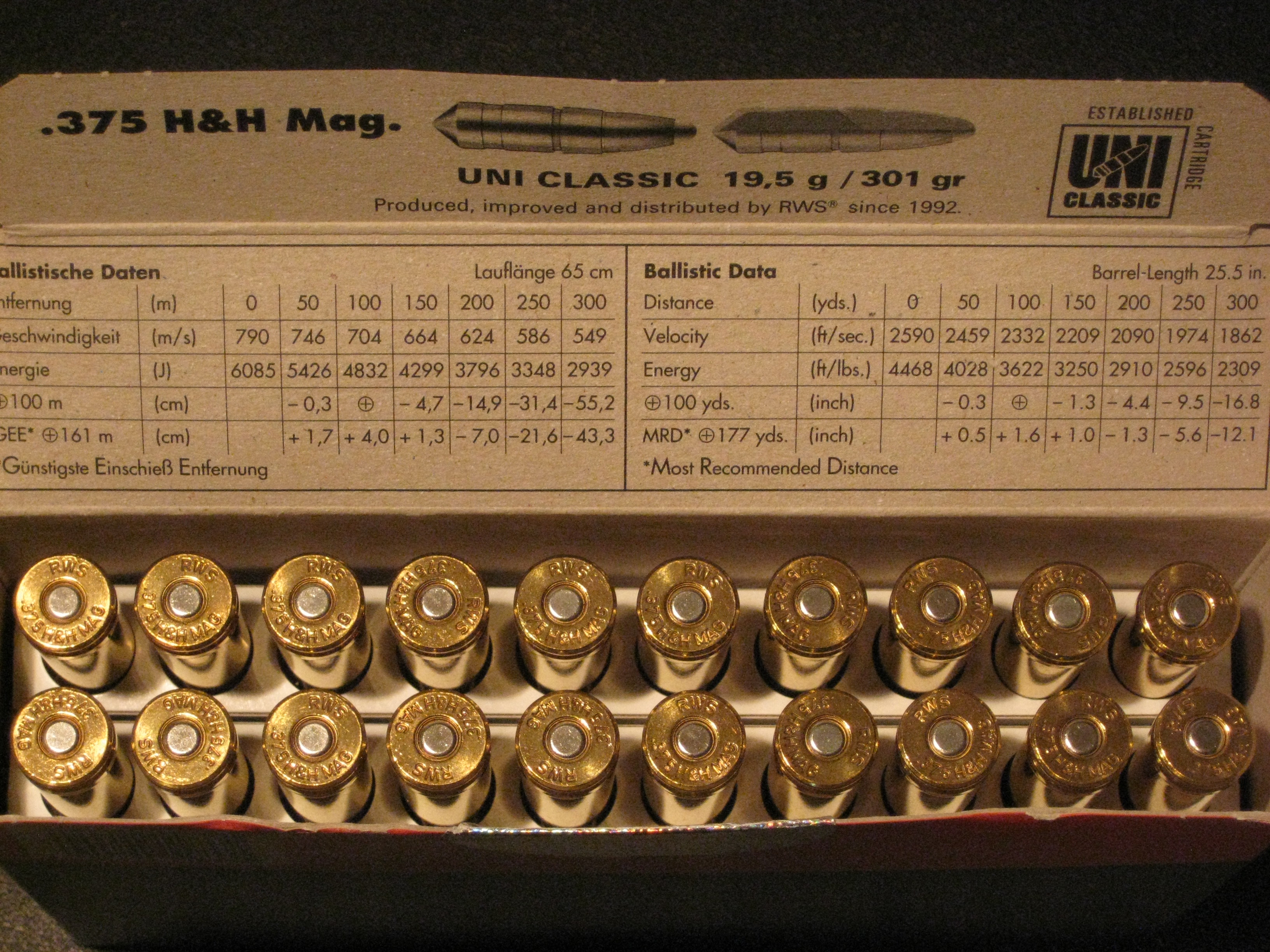
box of cartridges

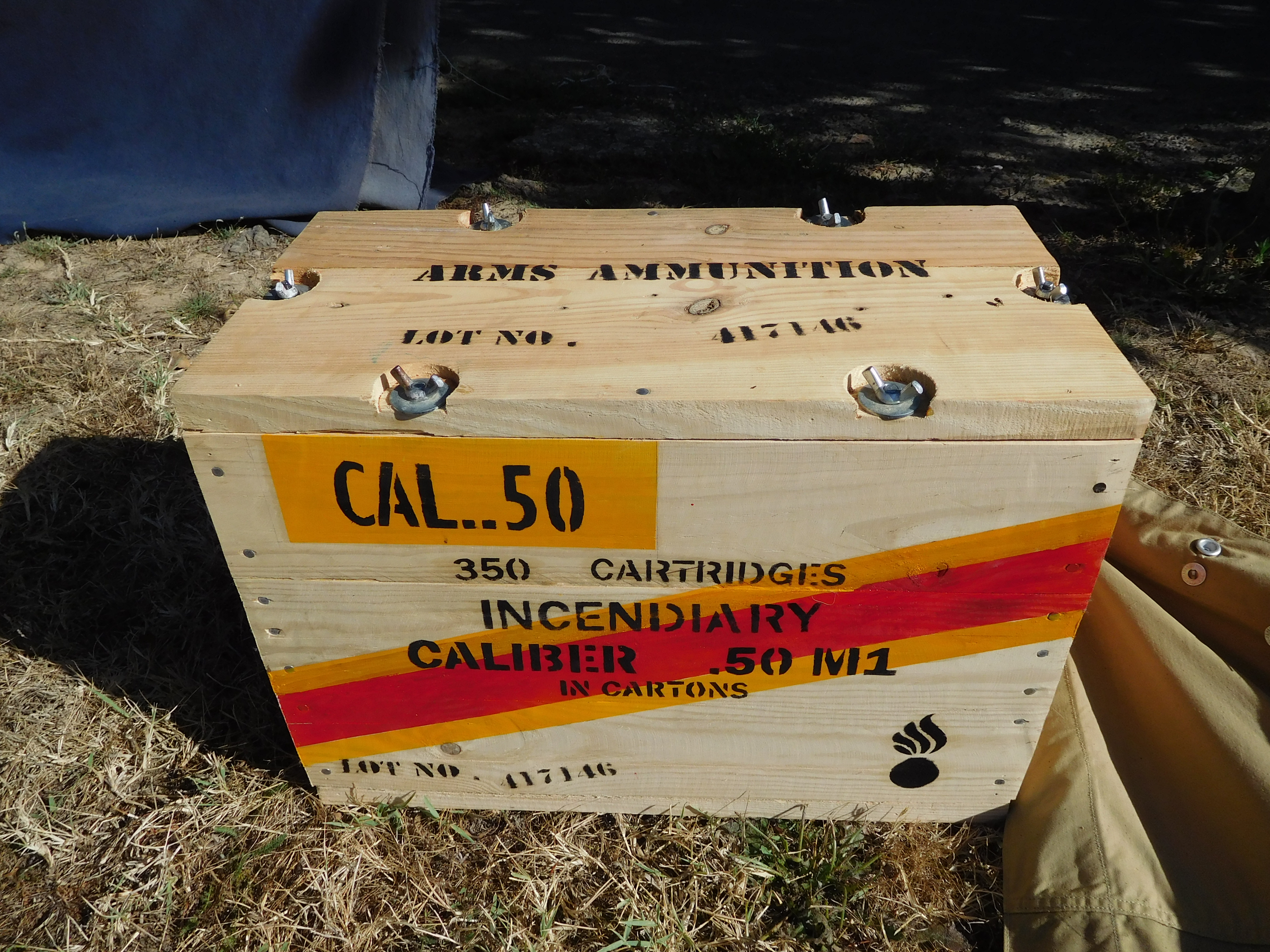
Wooden box, WWII

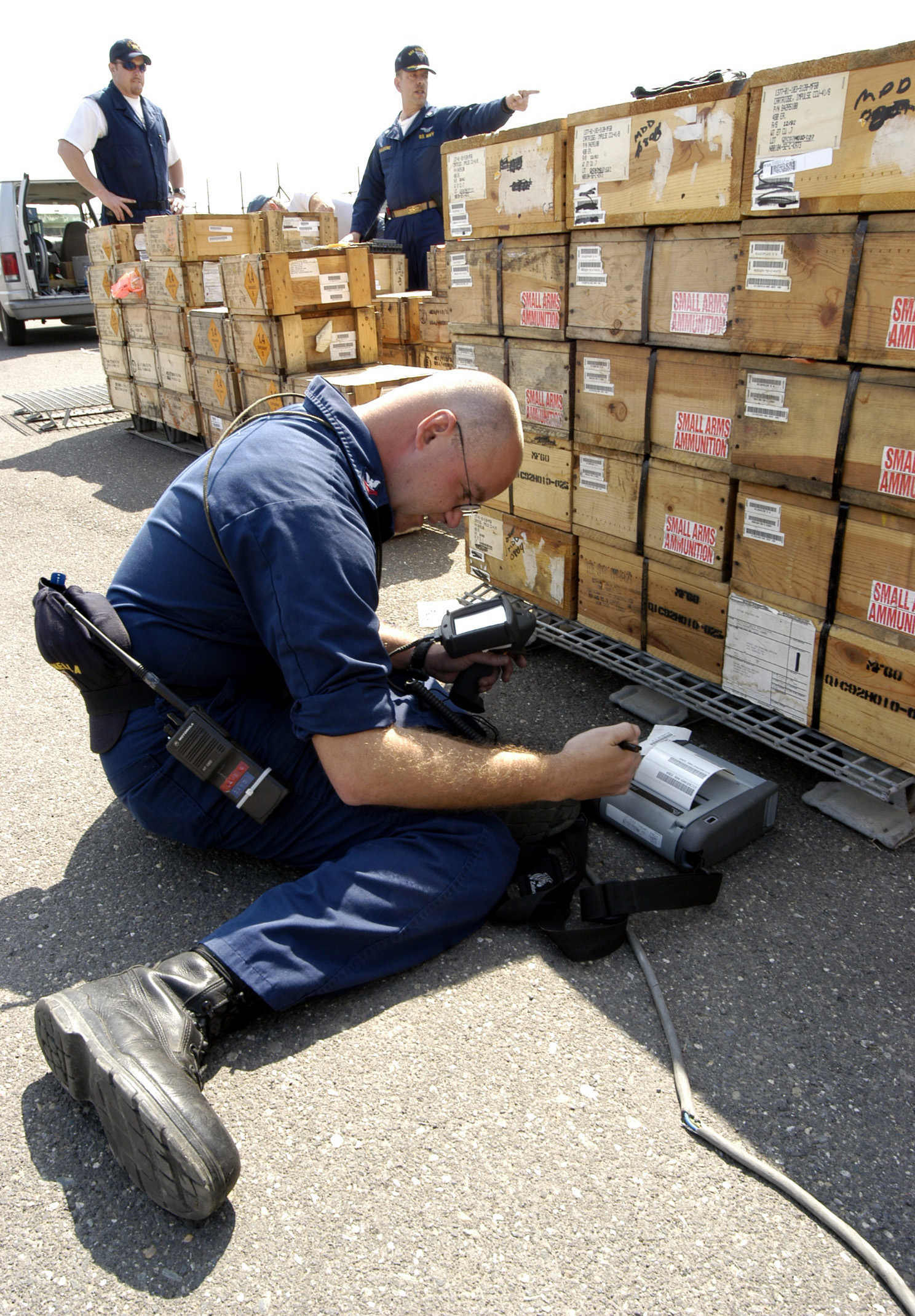
Checking bar codes on wooden ammunition boxes

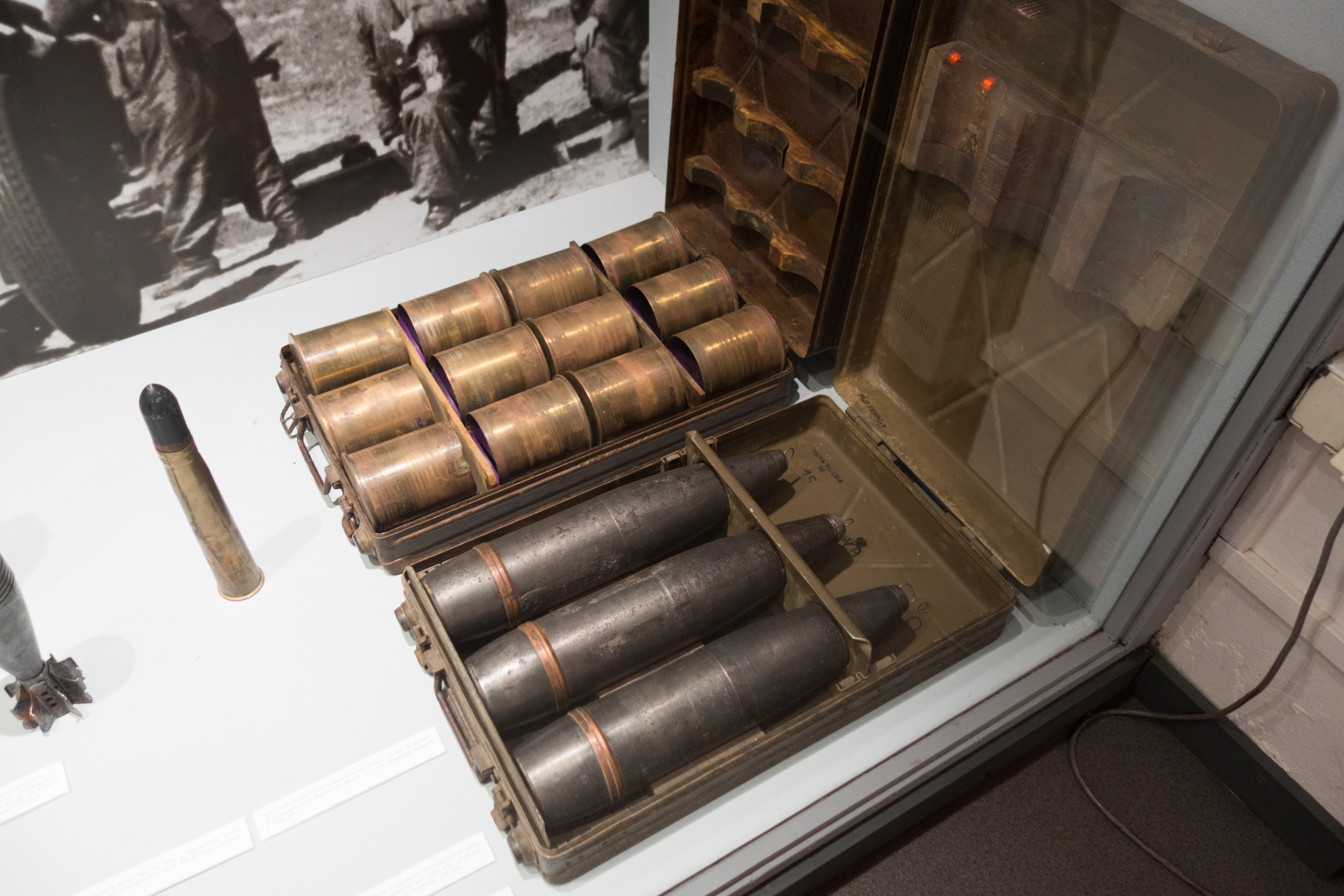
box of 100 mm Polish artillery shells

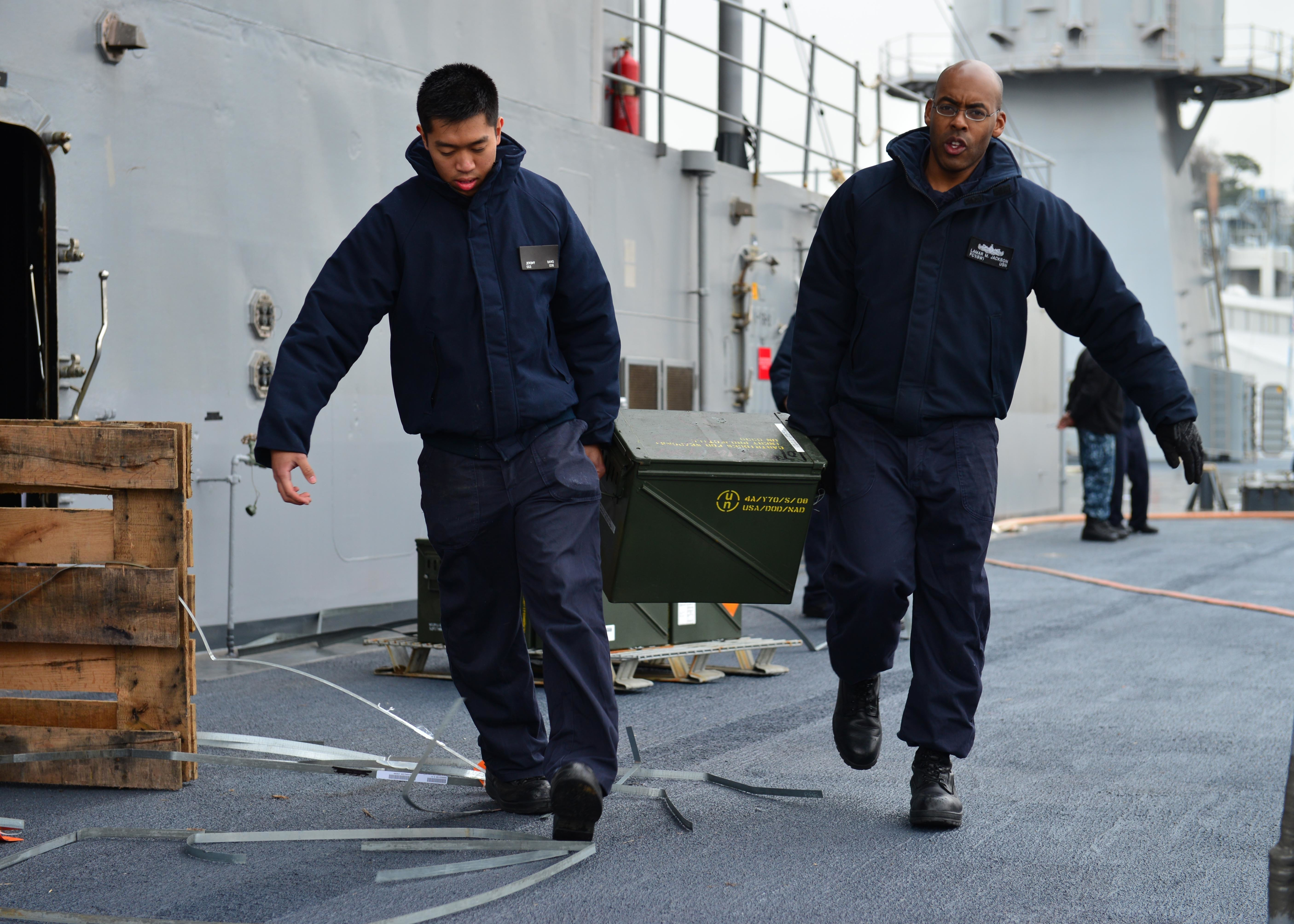
Sailors carrying box of ammunition

== See also ==
- Quiver
- Crate
- Wooden box
