= Magnetic nano =

Small metal container

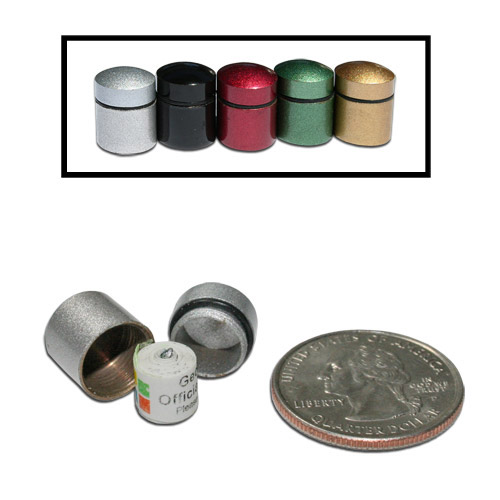
Magnetic nano containers. Top: Magnetic nanos in a variety of Metallic colours. Bottom: A magnetic nano next to a U.S. quarter dollar coin, for size comparison.

A magnetic nano (often shortened to just nano) is a small metal container, measuring a centimetre in height and width, with a screw-top lid and a thin, cylindrical magnet at its base. They often have an O-ring seal between the lid and the body to make them easier to open and partially waterproof.

== Original use ==
Magnetic nanos were originally manufactured in 2001 to store flashing LED lights for use as jewellery, giving them the colloquial name 'blinkies'. The LED went inside the lid, with two button batteries inside the nano's tube and a rare-earth magnet at the base, so the nano could attach to clothing and jewellery.

== Use as geocache containers ==
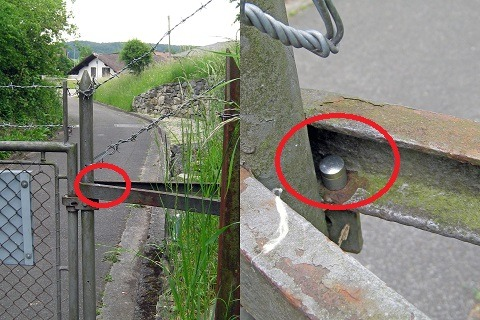
A silver magnetic nano geocache attached to a gatepost in Aargau, Switzerland.

When it was discovered that magnetic nanos can be used as geocache containers, they were quickly mass-produced and sold for that purpose. They are widely known in the geocaching community as one of the smallest geocache containers.

Magnetic nano geocaches only contain a thin, rolled-up paper sheet for geocachers to sign their username initials on.

=== Popularity ===
Due to their very small size, they have become especially popular in urban locations (particularly cities), allowing for geocaches to easily be hidden in these areas. With larger geocaches, there are limitations to where urban geocaches can be well hidden without raising alarm. Magnetic nanos, however, are often too small to be noticed and their magnetic nature means they can attach to, and blend in with, the vast majority of urban metallic structures such as benches, metal fences/railings, and road signs.

=== Size Classification ===
Some geocache listing websites, such as Geocaching.com, don't have 'nano' as a size to select from when creating a cache listing, so geocachers are advised to list nano geocaches as 'micro', as they are less than 10 millilitres in volume

Some geocachers believe that 'nano' should be a separate size to 'micro' due to their noticeable size difference, so use the 'other' or 'not specified' size option.

=== Issues ===
Magnetic nanos are not completely weatherproof, even with an O-ring seal, and this can present some issues:

The paper log sheets inside nanos can sometimes become jammed and difficult to extract and roll back up, particularly if water has entered the nano. As a result, it is recommended that geocachers bring tweezers if they are finding nano caches and this is usually written on the geocache's webpage. Also, in cold conditions, if no rubber seal is present, then the nano can freeze and become difficult to open.
