= Benchmarking (hobby) =

Outdoor game

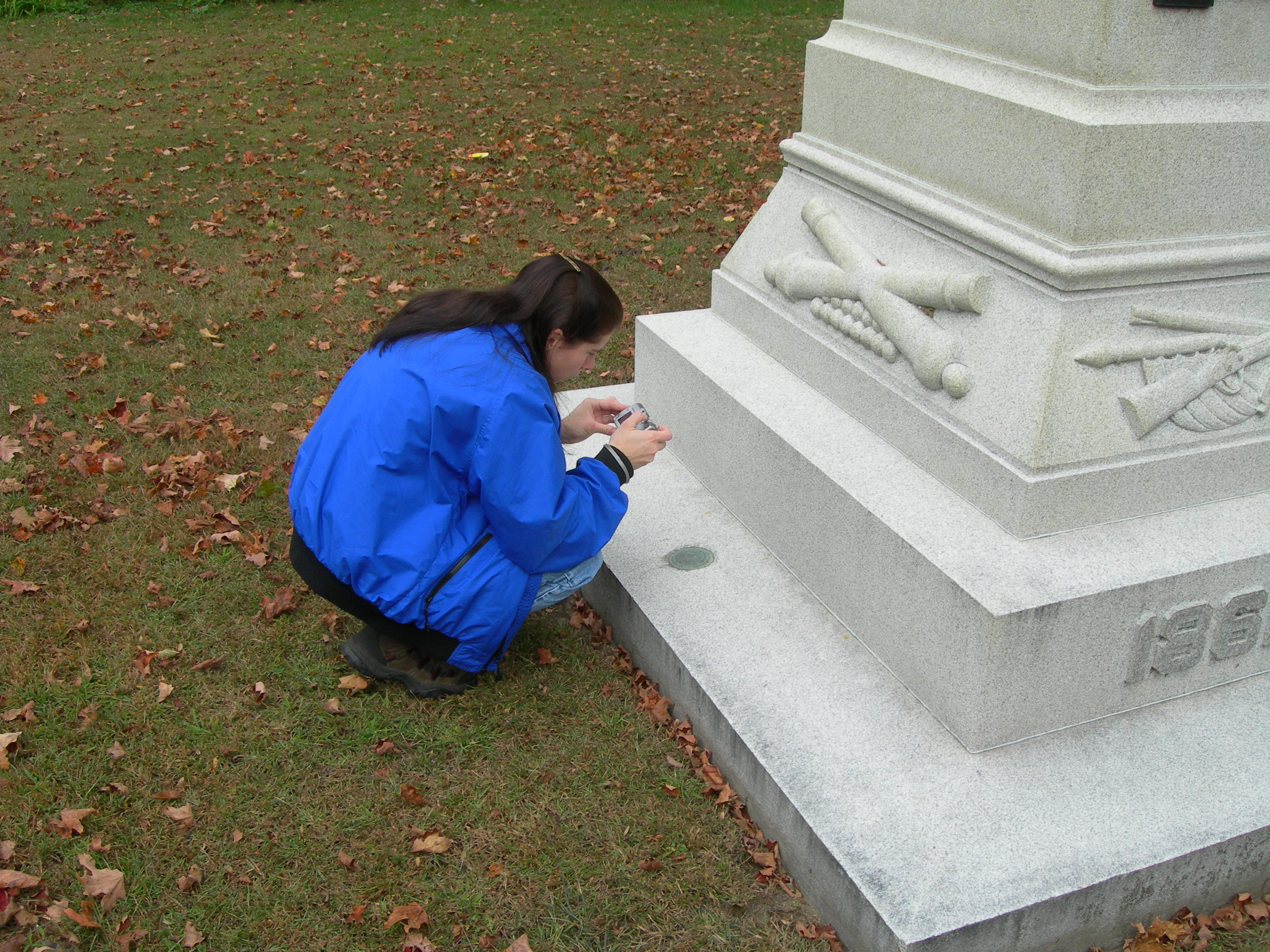
A person taking a photo of a located benchmark on a statue

Benchmarking, also known as benchmark hunting, is a hobby activity in which participants find benchmarks (also known as survey markers or geodetic control points). The term "benchmark" is used only to refer to survey markers that designate a certain elevation, but hobbyists often use the term benchmarks to include triangulation stations or other reference marks. Like geocaching, the activity has become popular since 1995, propelled by the availability of online data on the location of survey marks (with directions for finding them) and by the rise of hobbyist-oriented websites.

== History ==
Many survey markers in the U.S. were set over 100 years ago. There was a surge in creating these marks in the U.S. from about 1930 to 1955, in conjunction with the expansion of map-making activities across the country.

== Sources of data on U.S. marks ==
In the U.S., about 740,000 benchmarks with precise elevations or coordinates (but only a small fraction of the existing survey marks) are listed in a database maintained by the National Geodetic Survey (NGS) and accessible online. The majority of marks are set by the United States Geological Survey (USGS), the United States Forest Service, the United States Army Corps of Engineers, cities, states, and local authorities. Cadastral (land survey) marks are usually not measured for the geodetic database.

Each NGS-listed mark has a permanent identifier (PID), a six-character code that can be used to call up data about that mark on the National Geodetic Survey website. Other websites offer maps of the locations (and PIDs) of marks in each individual state of the U.S. Until 2023, Geocaching.com had a section of its site devoted to benchmarking.

Some of these marks have precise coordinates, including latitude and longitude, that are accurate to 1 millimetre (0.039 in) precision. Others, typically true elevation benchmarks, have only coordinates that have been scaled from a map. Scaled coordinates, unlike surveyed ones, were read from a topographic map. While many are accurate to within 100 feet (30 m), some are located as far as 3,000–4,000 feet (910–1,220 m) away from the mark they refer to. This makes it difficult to locate them using a handheld GPS unit. Most marks have clear descriptions for how to reach them, but some lack complete descriptions. Additionally, changes in the surrounding buildings, roads, or terrain over decades may make the descriptions obsolete, as some marks have been removed due to construction or buried over time.

== Useful tools ==
In addition to the survey data sheet for a mark being hunted, many hunters bring along a digital camera to take close-up and area pictures of the survey mark (a disk, a cross-cut in a rock, an old copper bolt, etc.). These photographs, as well as a current description of the mark by the person who finds ("recovers") the location of the mark, can then be uploaded to a website as proof of a find. Surveyors use the term "recovering" as a synonym for "finding" a mark. This does not mean that the found mark should be disturbed in any way. On the contrary—disturbing a survey mark in even a small way often destroys its usefulness to surveyors and others. In the U.S., benchmark hunters often reports on marks they find to the NGS database. It describes the mark's found/not found status, photos, current condition, and updated directions to reach it so that others (particularly surveyors) can easily re-find the mark.

Benchmark hunters also frequently carry a compass (to follow directions gleaned from the datasheet), a probe (like a long-bladed screwdriver) to search for buried marks, a trowel (or a small shovel) to uncover buried marks, a whisk broom (to clear away debris), and one or more tape measures of various lengths, used in taping out referenced distances found on the data sheets.

Handheld GPS receivers are often used to get within a few yards probable error of a mark that has adjusted coordinates. Metal detectors are useful for finding marks that have become deeply buried over time. The use of several of the tools in combination is sometimes required, but many marks are set on the surface of sidewalks, buildings, walls, boulders, or monuments and can often be found without the need for special tools.

== Description of markers ==
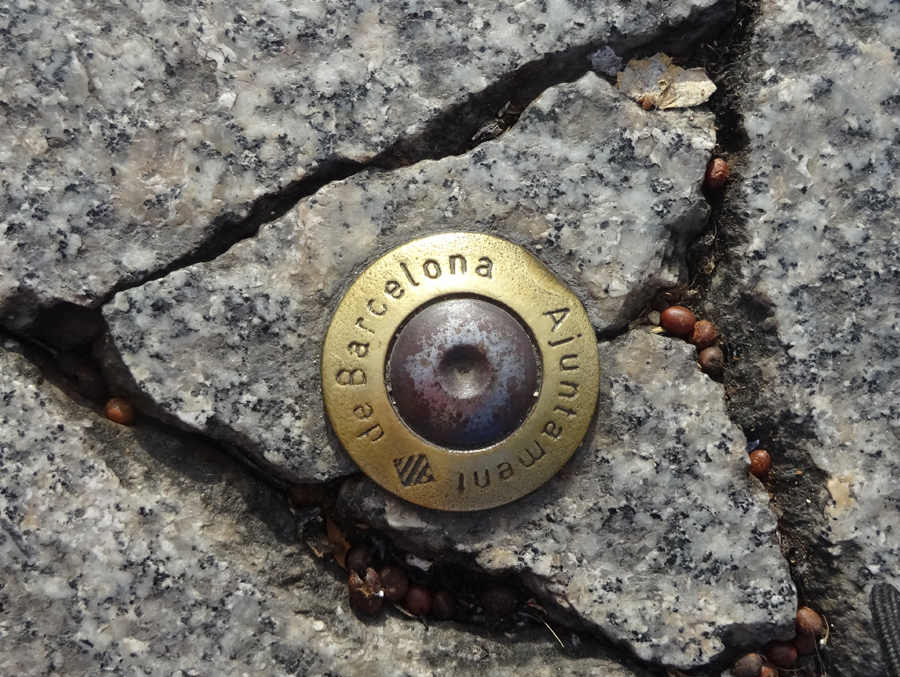
Vial Moll de Bosch i Alsina in Barcelona

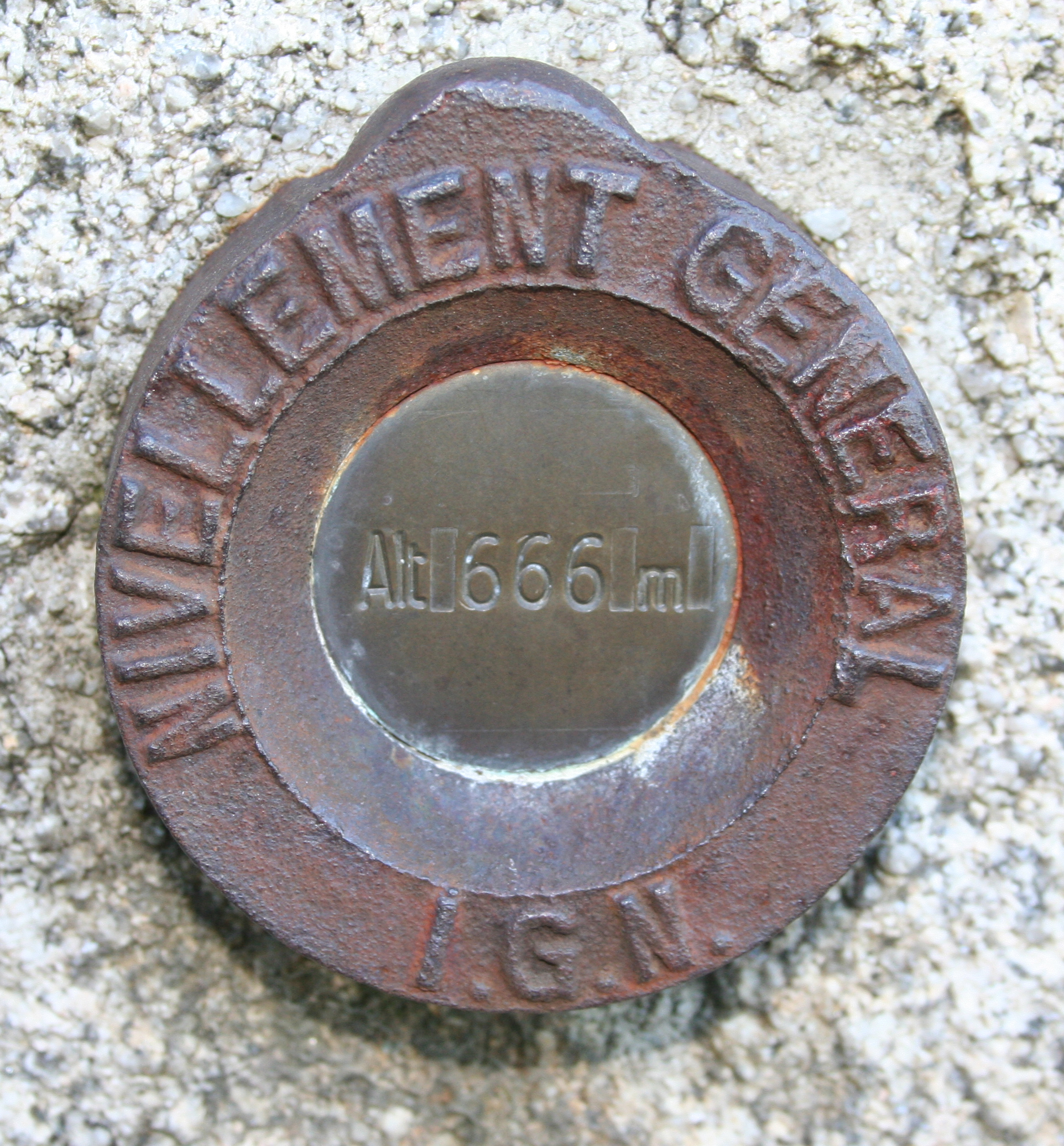
Benchmark in Saint Goussaud, Limousin, France

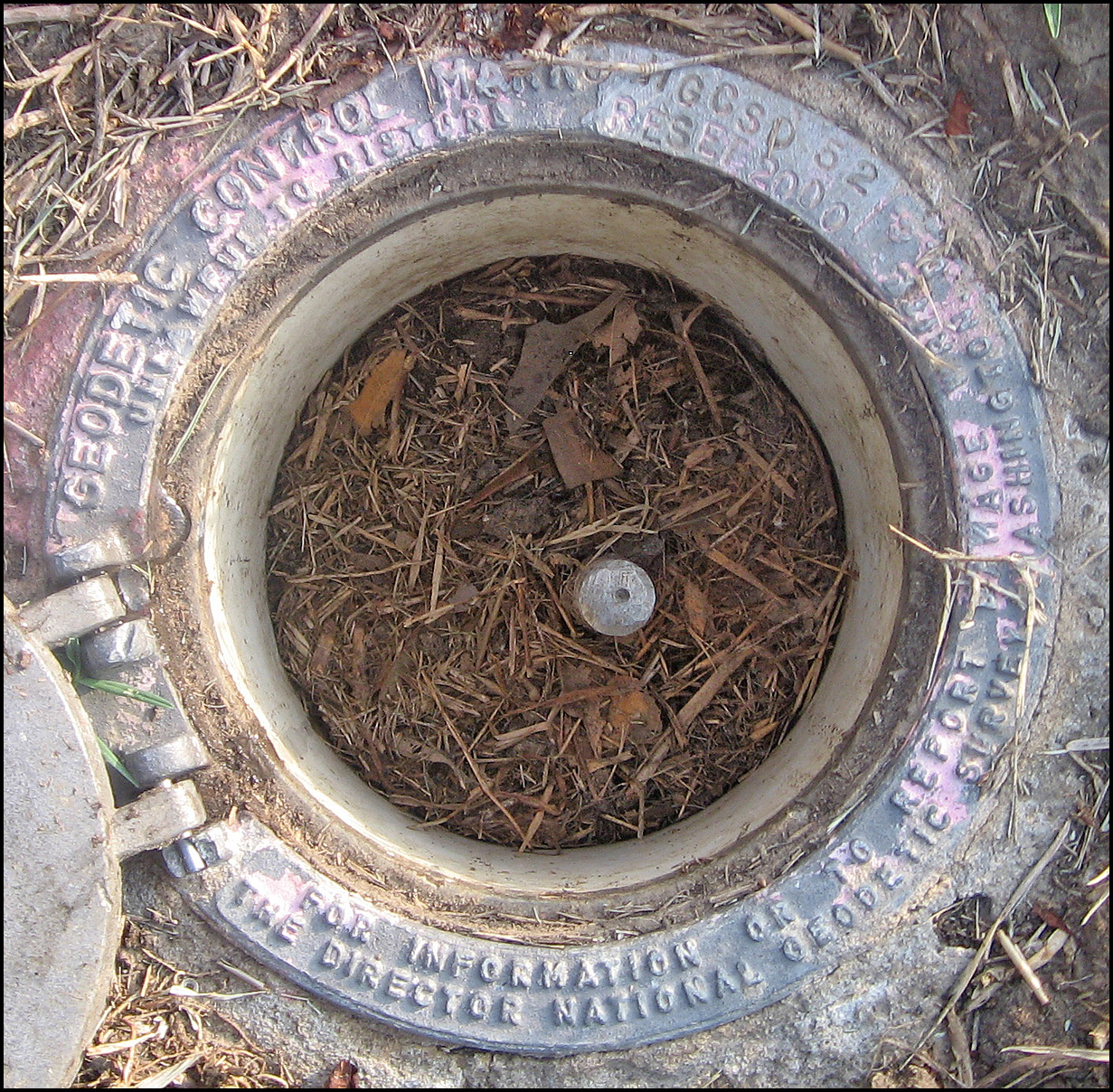
Typical metal rod or stake benchmark, in Texas

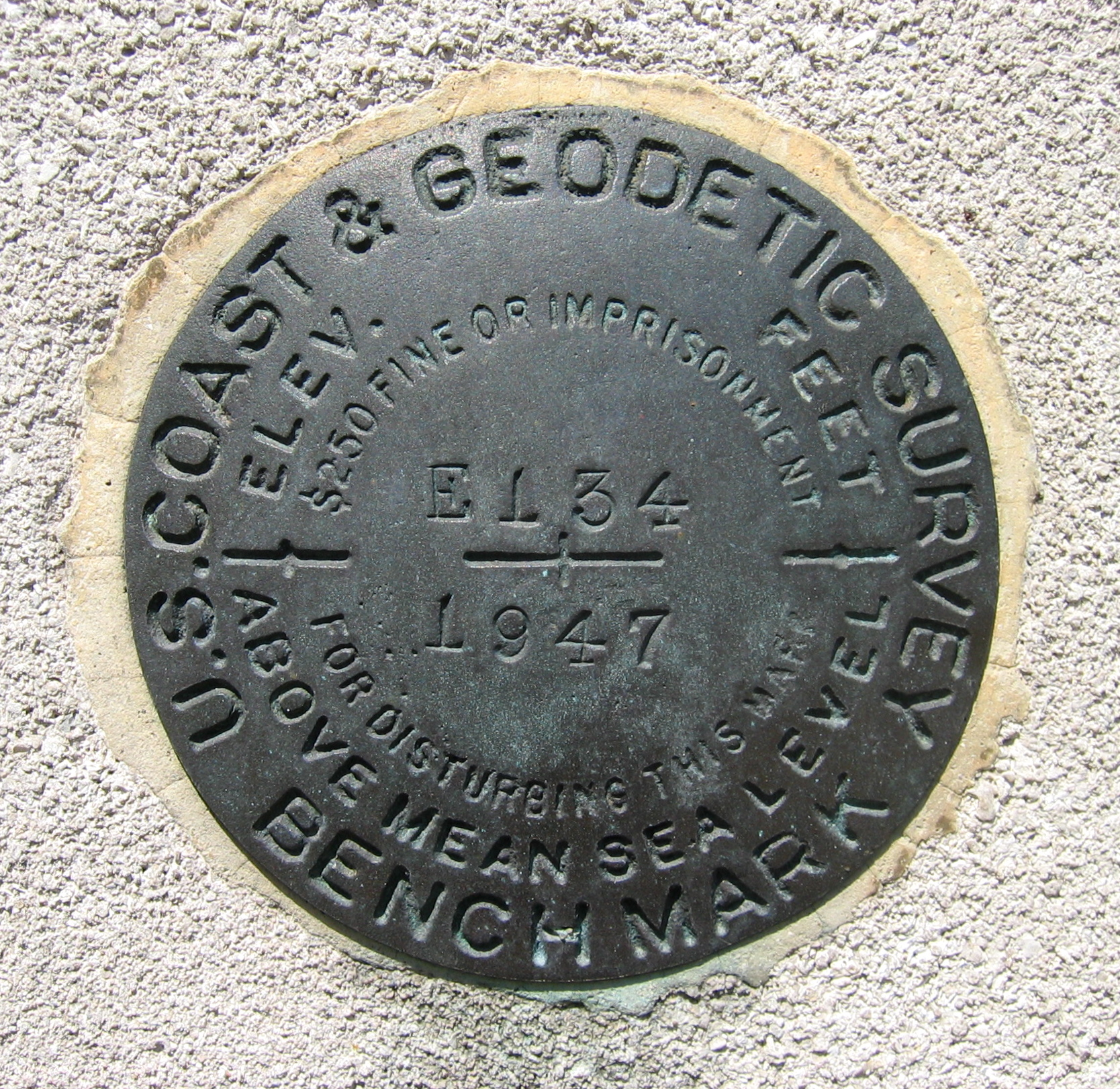
A typical USCGS Benchmark

Survey markers vary considerably from one country to another. In the U.S., they are usually bronze discs about 3.5 inches in diameter. A typical disk is slightly inset into the top of a concrete pillar set vertically with its surface flush with the ground or projecting slightly. Others are metal rods driven into the ground and possibly surrounded by a capped metal or plastic pipe that can be engraved and stamped like disks. Disks can also be set in rock ledges or boulders and in the concrete of a large structure such as a building, bridge abutment, or the base of a tower. In the UK, the mark is usually carved into a wall, or on a metal plate set into a wall.

In the U.S., a survey disk is usually engraved with the name of the agency that placed it. The name of the mark (or the "station" it locates) is usually stamped into its surface, along with the date on which it was set (or re-set, since markers that have been destroyed, can be replaced). Disks marked with a triangle are known as "triangulation station disks" since they mark the position of the primary point used for triangulation (or map-making). Disks marked with an arrow are called reference marks (RMs) since they point (or "refer") to the principal station that may be located many feet away. A triangulation station often had two or three reference marks. Reference marks were set to enable the primary station to be re-established (or re-set) if needed. Sometimes a survey mark is made much easier to find by the presence nearby of a witness post, a stake (or a small sign) driven into the ground, and used to draw attention to (and to warn against disturbing) the mark.

Care must be taken to ensure that a found disk is the one described on the data sheet, so as to avoid false reports. A reference mark may be mistakenly reported as the station mark. A disk set in 1945 may be confused with a similarly named disk that was set in 1946 by a different agency, and so on. A reset elevation benchmark should not be reported as the original. Sorting out these differences and reporting them correctly is an important part of the hobby.

== Typical locations ==
In the U.S., markers are often found at the summits of mountains, along ridge lines, or on bare rock ledges with commanding views, because such sites provide good vantage points for triangulation lines to distant points. U.S. elevation benchmarks were often placed along rail lines or roads that provided good sight lines for leveling. A common location is the top level of the abutment of a highway bridge or its wing walls.

As part of triangulation networks, intersection stations were sighted. They are typically tall, prominent, and well-defined points like a smokestack, the peak of a water tower, or a church spire. However, many of these objects have been altered or replaced by similar nearby structures and no longer mark the original location, so careful identification is required.

U.S. benchmarks were commonly placed on public buildings, such as courthouses, post offices, city halls, and older schools. Benchmarks are often located on private property, or access to them can only be achieved by crossing privately owned land, so permission is needed for access.

=== In the UK ===
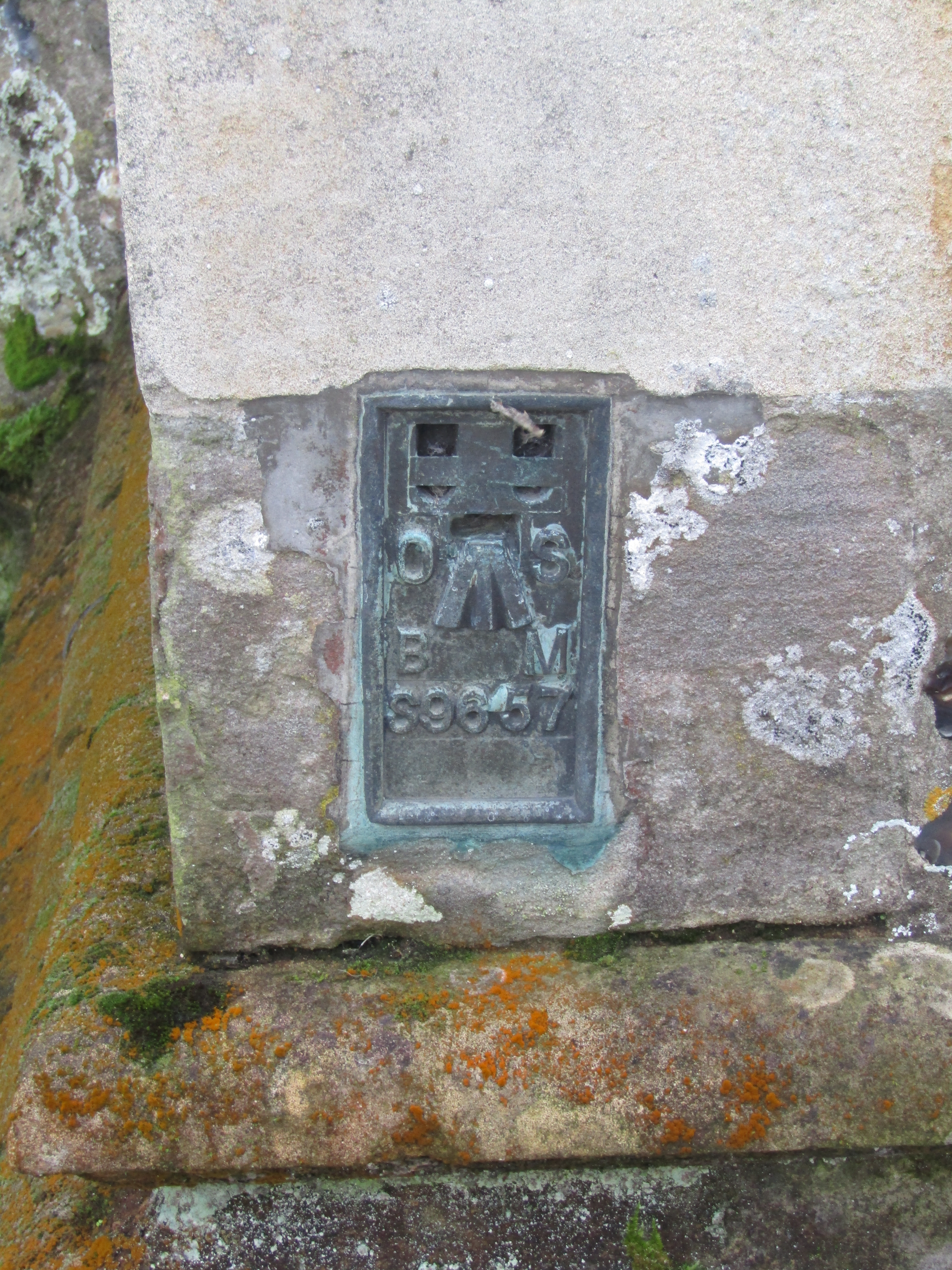
An Ordnance Survey flush bracket on the corner of a wall of the Church of Saint Andrew the Apostle in Holt, Norfolk in England

UK benchmarks tend to be on the corners of pubs, churches, and other public buildings, as well as farm buildings, railway bridges, and private houses especially those near a road junction. However, any building may be used, as well as natural features such as a rock outcrop.

In the United Kingdom, "trig-pointing" is a recreational activity similar to benchmarking. Searching for trig points is more popular than hunting benchmarks in the UK, but there is considerable overlap in participation. "Trig points" is the common name for "triangulation pillars". These are concrete pillars, about 4 feet tall, which were used by the Ordnance Survey in order to determine the exact shape of the country in a project known as the retriangulation of Great Britain, which was carried out from 1936 to 1962. They are generally located on the highest bit of ground in the area so that there is a direct line of sight from one to the next. By setting a theodolite on the top of the pillar, accurate bearings to nearby trig points could be taken. This process is called triangulation.

There are 6550 such pillars listed in the T:UK database. While most of them have fallen into disuse, about 184 of them are currently used in the Passive Station network. These are maintained so they can be used as accurately located anchor points for differential GPS comparisons and are re-surveyed every five years to calibrate for any geological movements of the ground.

== In popular culture ==
- The cartoon character Marvin Marker is based on a benchmark and was created to help preserve benchmarking in 1960.
