= Munzee =

Worldwide Outdoor game where you hunt for QR codes

- Logo used since 2018
- First played: July 1, 2011; Texas, United States

Characteristics
- Team members: Rob Vardeman - President; Louise Gibson - Global Munzee Events Director
- Type: Recreational activity
- Equipment: Mobile phone or tablet computer with GPS receiver

Presence
- Country or region: Worldwide

Munzee is a freemium scavenger hunt game where QR codes have to be found at different places in the real world. The game is similar to geocaching but uses QR code technology, in addition to device GPS location, to prove the find instead of a logbook. Launched in McKinney, Texas in 2011, the game caught on first in Germany, along with California and Michigan. It is now played in more than 188 countries around the world, and there is at least one physical Munzee deployed on every continent, including Antarctica.

The QR codes are placed by players at places of interest and are often printed on weatherproof stickers. Previously, the places could also be marked by a NFC tag, however this functionality was removed in 2018. These stickers are called Munzees. Both the finding and the hiding players receive points for deploying and finding Munzees. The QR codes on the Munzees are read by means of a smartphone app for iOS or Android. The coordinates of the Munzees as well as the data of the players are managed via the central web platform.

Virtual Munzees are also available for purchase. These also appear in app lists and on maps, and they are "captured" by locating the app device within 300 feet of the designated location. The device must also be within 300 feet of a QR code Munzee to verify "capture."

== History ==
A common misconception is that the idea for Munzee was inspired by Geocaching, a game in which participants search for a hidden cache using GPS technology. However, Munzee founder Aaron Benzick (having never been a geocacher) came up with the idea of using QR codes for a game in 2008, but smartphone technology and capability were not available at the time. Benzick, and co-founders, Scott Foster, Chris Pick, and Josh Terkelsen launched the game on July 1, 2011. The term Munzee was derived from the German word for coin, Münze. Since the domain name munze.com was no longer available, an 'e' was added, which also resulted in what the company felt was a catchy name. The original idea was to use poker chips or rounded coins with QR codes.

== Munzees ==
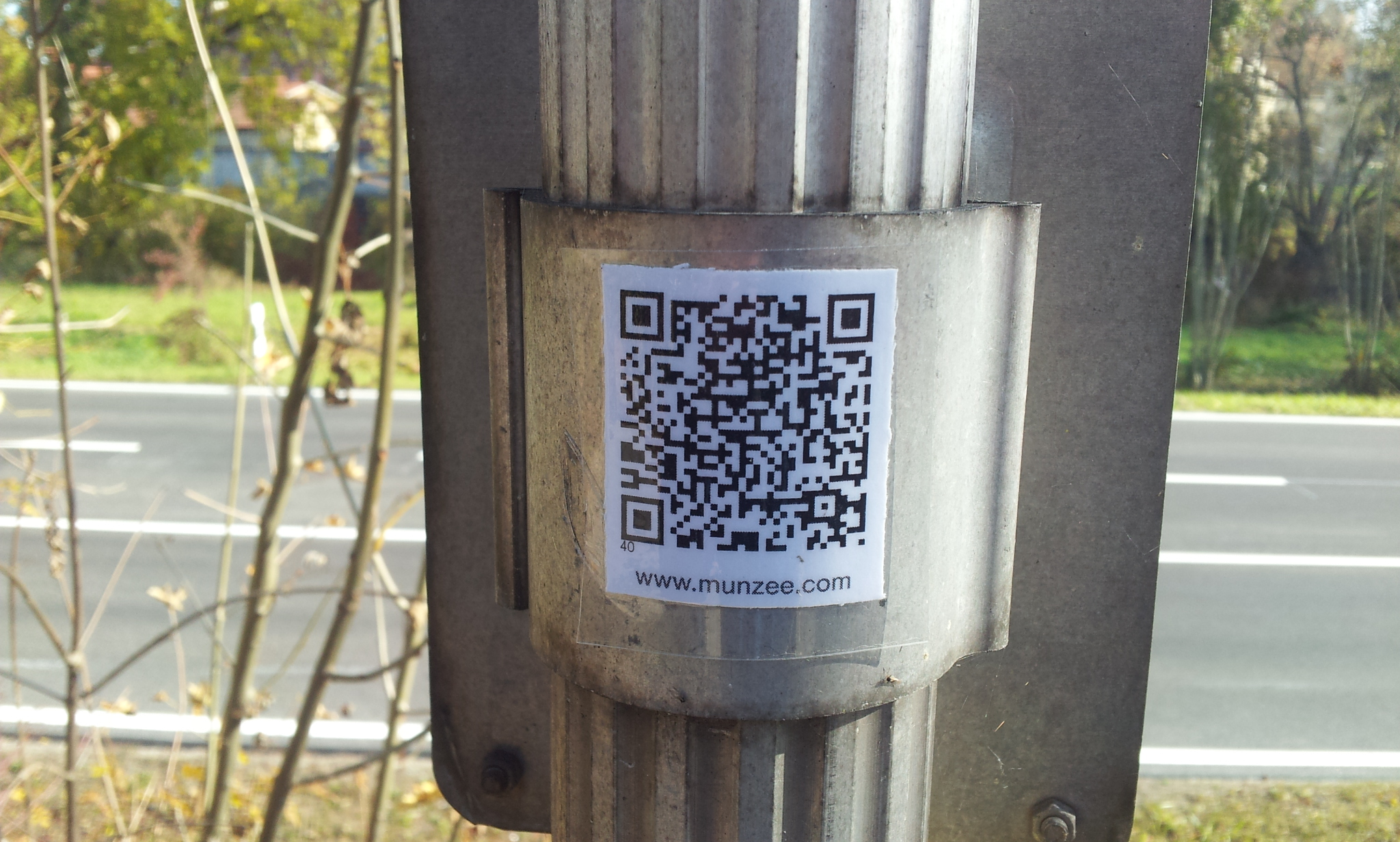
Munzee on the back of a traffic sign

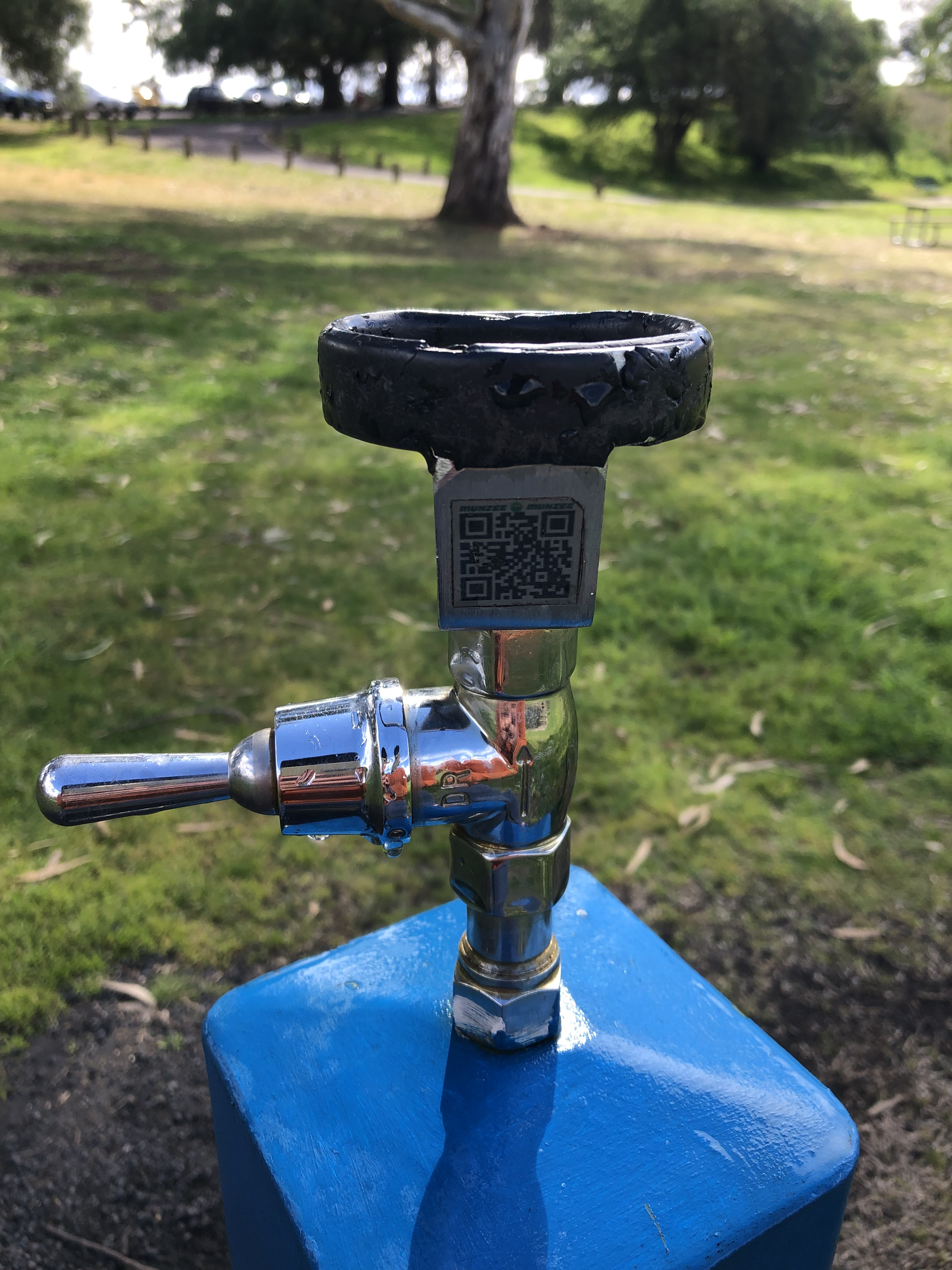
Greenie on a drinking tap, Brimbank Park

Munzees can consist of any material; they must have at minimum a QR-code and physically meet the conditions of the location (waterproof, weatherproof, etc.). Munzees either can be self-generated and printed or be purchased via the web store or through authorised distributors. Virtual Munzees can be purchased from the web store, or in-app.

To generate or to order Munzees one has to be logged in on the central platform with a unique username. When generating a Munzee, the platform creates a web link, over which the generated Munzee can be managed. This web link is represented as a QR code on the Munzee. A descriptive name and an arbitrarily long comment can be assigned to the Munzee as properties. Both are stored on the central platform (not in the QR code) and can be changed later.

After a Munzee is physically created, it can be assigned coordinates anywhere outdoors or indoors and then deployed via the app. Once the Munzee has been deployed it goes live on the map and is ready to be found or "captured" by other players. If a Munzee is damaged or removed, players can report the malfunction and after two reports the owner of the Munzee is given 30 days to rectify the problem; after which time the Munzee is taken off the map and archived. Additionally, dedicated players in the QRew or ZeeQRew programs are now able to replace other users' damaged munzees with generic stickers.

The coordinates of all globally mounted Munzees are managed on the game platform at munzee.com. Players navigate themselves to the general location of a Munzee by accessing the map with a smartphone. When they find a Munzee, they capture it by either scanning the QR code or being within a certain radius of the published coordinates. The smartphone app sends the data scanned along with current coordinates to the central system which records the capture. The finder and the player that deployed the Munzee each earn points. The points award to the person who deploys the munzee and who captures the munzee vary depending on the playing piece deployed.

== Dissemination ==
As of April 2026, there are almost 17.2 million munzees worldwide in 240 countries, and more than 1 billion Munzee captures have been recorded. There are also over 765,000 registered users.
