= Geocaching =

Outdoor recreational activity

- International Geocaching Logo
- Nicknames: Caching, treasure hunting
- First played: May 3, 2000; Beavercreek, Oregon, U.S.

Characteristics
- Team members: Optional
- Type: Recreational activity
- Equipment: GPS receiver or GPS-enabled mobile device, writing implement

Presence
- Country or region: Worldwide

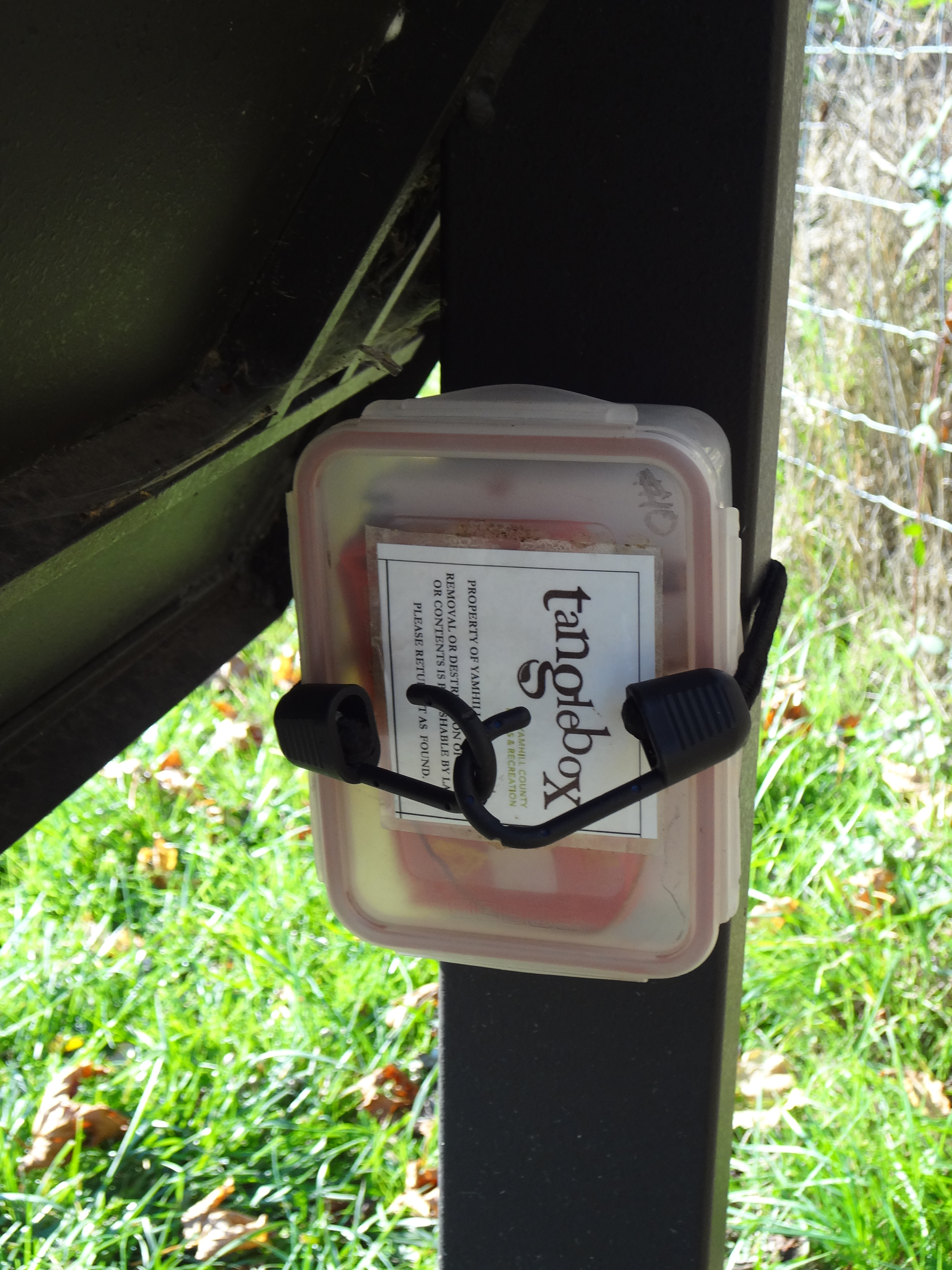
A geocache concealed behind a sign in the Erratic Rock State Natural Site state park

Geocaching (/ˈdʒiːoʊkæʃɪŋ/, JEE-oh-KASH-ing) is an outdoor recreational activity, in which participants use a Global Positioning System (GPS) receiver or mobile device and other navigational techniques to hide and seek containers, called geocaches or caches, at specific locations marked by coordinates all over the world. The first geocache was placed in May 2000, and as of 2023 there were over three million active caches worldwide.

Geocaching can be considered a real-world, outdoor treasure-hunting game. A typical cache is a small waterproof container containing a logbook and sometimes a pen or pencil. The geocacher signs the log with their established code name/username and dates it, to prove that they found the cache. After signing the log, the cache must be placed back exactly where the person found it. Larger containers such as plastic storage containers (Tupperware or similar) or ammo boxes can also contain items for trading, such as toys or trinkets, usually of more sentimental worth than financial. Geocaching shares many aspects with benchmarking, trigpointing, orienteering, treasure hunting, letterboxing, trail blazing, and another type of location-based game called Munzee.

== History ==
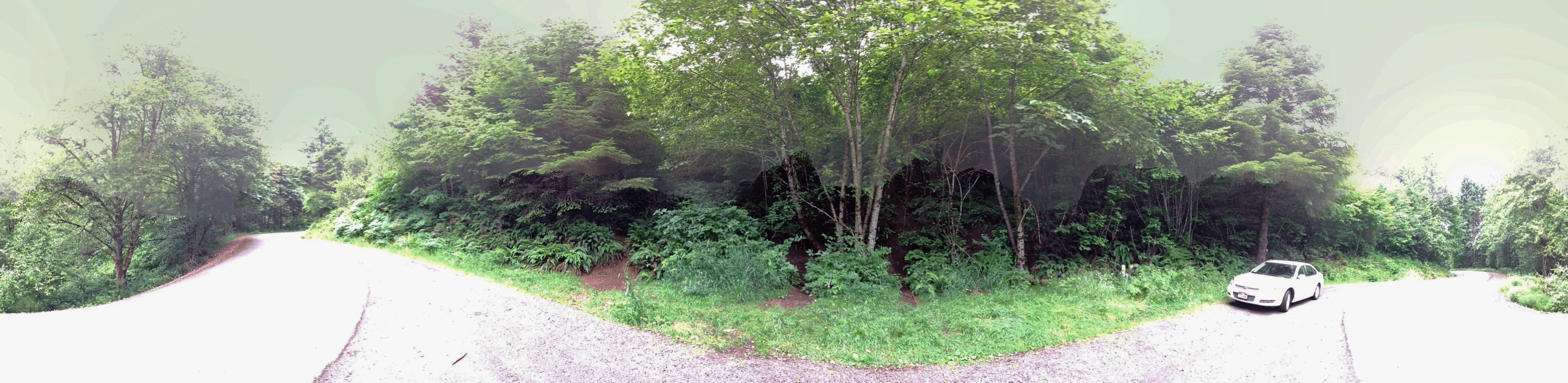
A 360° panoramic view of the site of the first geocache, in Beavercreek, Oregon, placed by Dave Ulmer

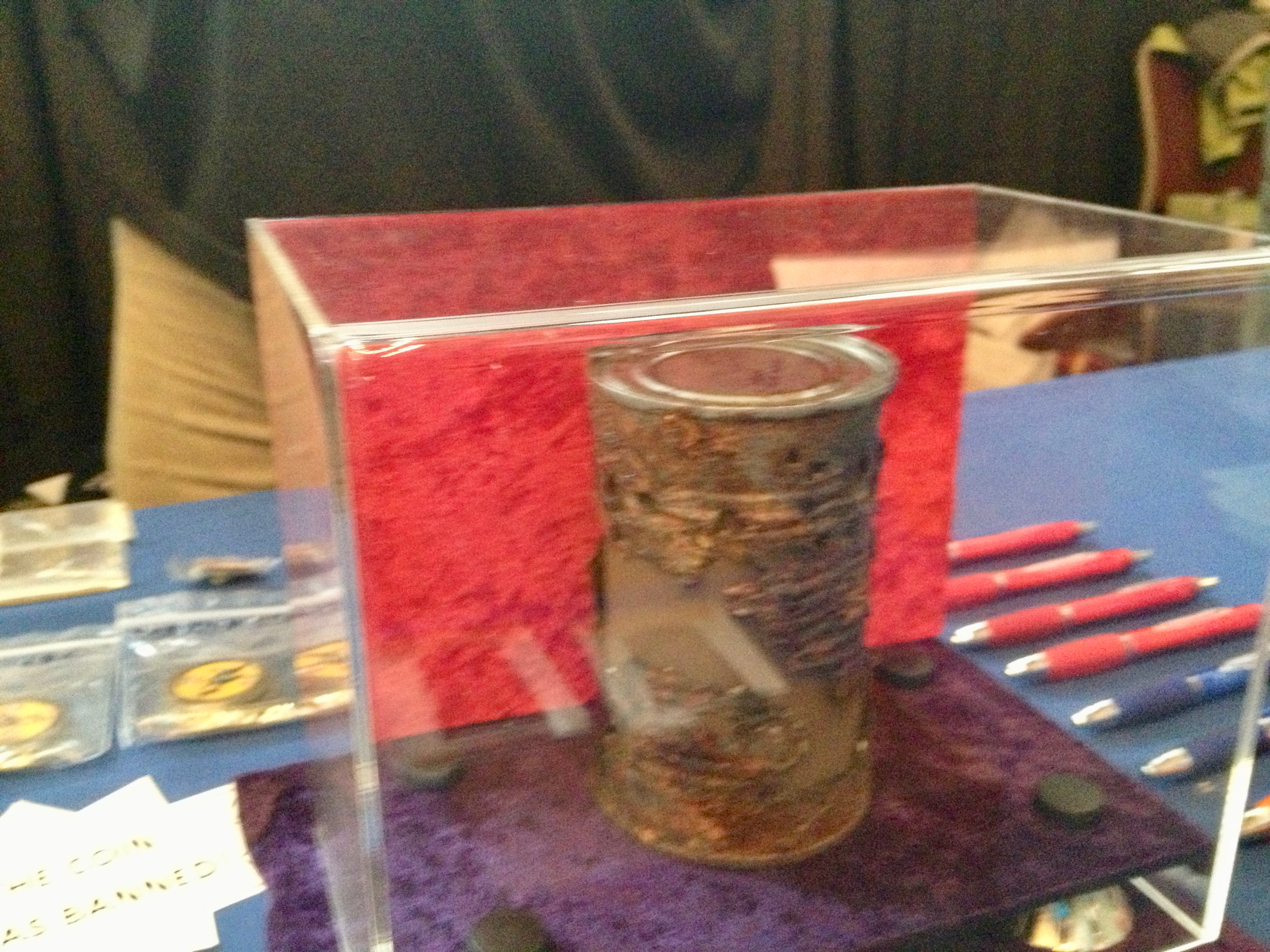
"Original Can of Beans", which was in the first geocache, at the 2012 Geocoinfest Mega Event in United States

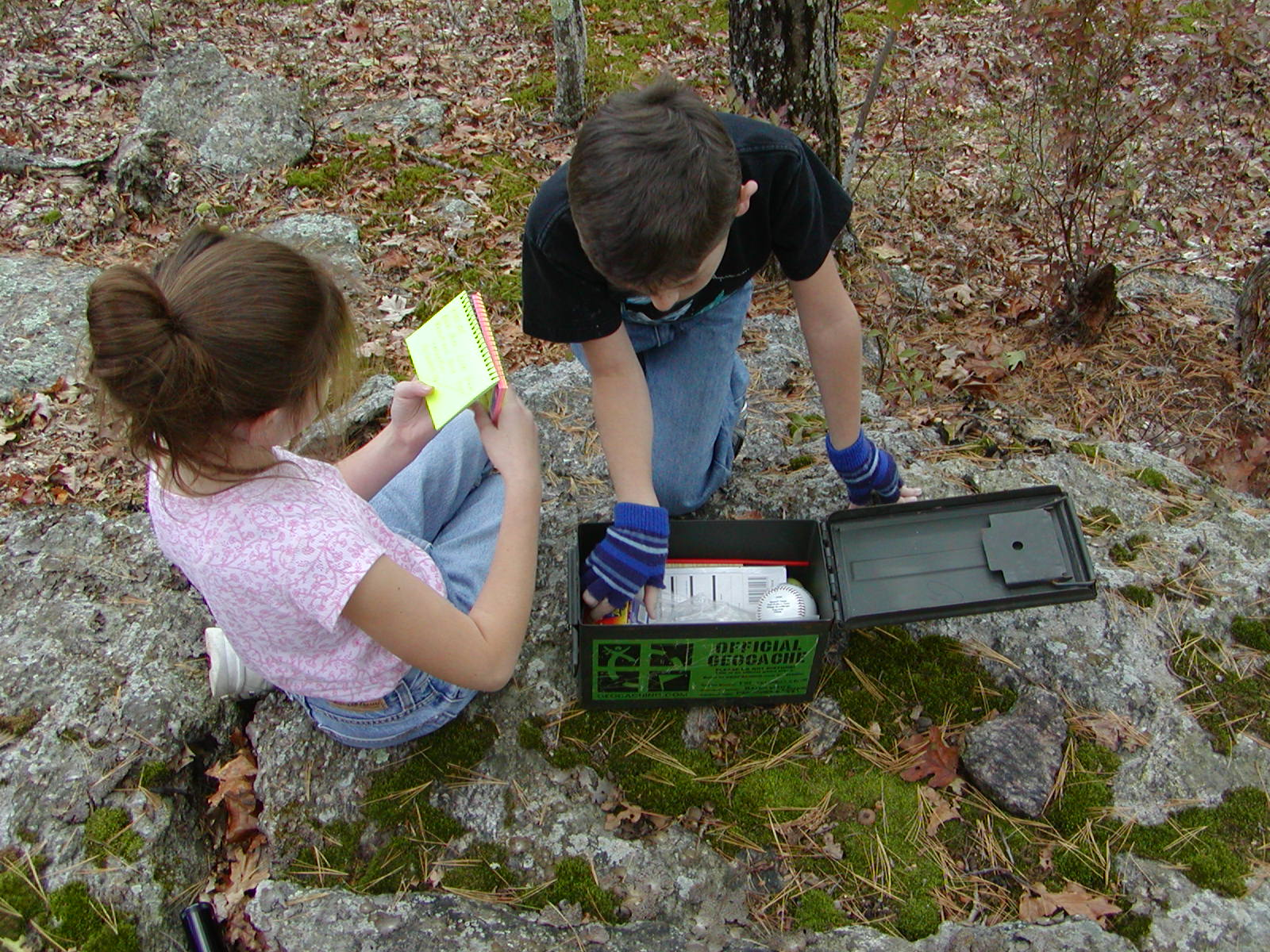
Children finding a geocache

Geocaching is similar to the game letterboxing (originating in 1854), which uses clues and references to landmarks embedded in stories. Geocaching was conceived shortly after the removal of selective availability from the Global Positioning System on May 2, 2000 (Blue Switch Day), because the improved accuracy of the system allowed for a small container to be specifically placed and located.

The first documented placement of a GPS-located cache took place on May 3, 2000, by Dave Ulmer in Beavercreek, Oregon, United States. The location was posted on the Usenet newsgroup sci.geo.satellite-nav at 45°17.460′N 122°24.800′W. Within three days, the cache had been found twice, first by Mike Teague. According to Dave Ulmer's message, this cache was a black plastic bucket that was partially buried and contained various items, such as software, videos, books, money, a can of beans, and a slingshot. The geocache and most of its contents were eventually destroyed by a lawn mower, but the can of beans was the only item salvaged and was later turned into a trackable item known as the "Original Can of Beans". Another geocache and plaque, called the Original Stash Tribute Plaque, now sits at the site. The activity was originally referred to as the GPS stash hunt or gpsstashing. This was changed shortly after the original hide when it was suggested in the gpsstash eGroup that "stash" could have negative connotations and the term geocaching was adopted.

Geocaching company Groundspeak allows extraterrestrial caches, e.g. the Moon or Mars, although presently, the website provides only earthbound coordinates. The first published extraterrestrial geocache was GC1BE91, which was placed on the International Space Station by Richard Garriott in 2008. It used the Baikonur launch area in Kazakhstan as its position. The original cache contained a Travel Bug (the first geocaching trackable item in space), which stayed on the space station until it was brought back to Earth in 2013. Due to fire restrictions on board the station, the geocache contained no official paper logbook. As of June 2024, only one confirmed geocacher (on November 17, 2013) has actually found the geocache, although others have claimed to have found it providing varying amounts of evidence. To commemorate the occasion, Groundspeak allowed specialized geocaching events to be published across the world, allowing attendees to obtain a virtual souvenir on their profile.

The second geocaching trackable in space is TB5EFXK which is attached to the SHERLOC calibration target on board the Mars Perseverance Rover, which landed on Mars on February 18, 2021. Geocachers were given the opportunity to virtually discover the trackable after the WATSON camera sent back its first photographs of the calibration target that contained the tracking code number. The code is printed on a prototype helmet visor material that will be used to test how well it can withstand the Martian environment. This will help scientists in creating a viable Martian spacesuit for future crewed missions to Mars.

An independent accounting of the early history documents several controversial actions taken by Jeremy Irish and Grounded, Inc., a predecessor to Groundspeak, to increase "commercialization and monopolistic control over the hobby". More recently, other similar hobbies such as Munzee have attracted some geocachers by rapidly adopting smart-phone technology, which has caused "some resistance from geocaching organizers about placing caches along with Munzees".

== Geocaches ==
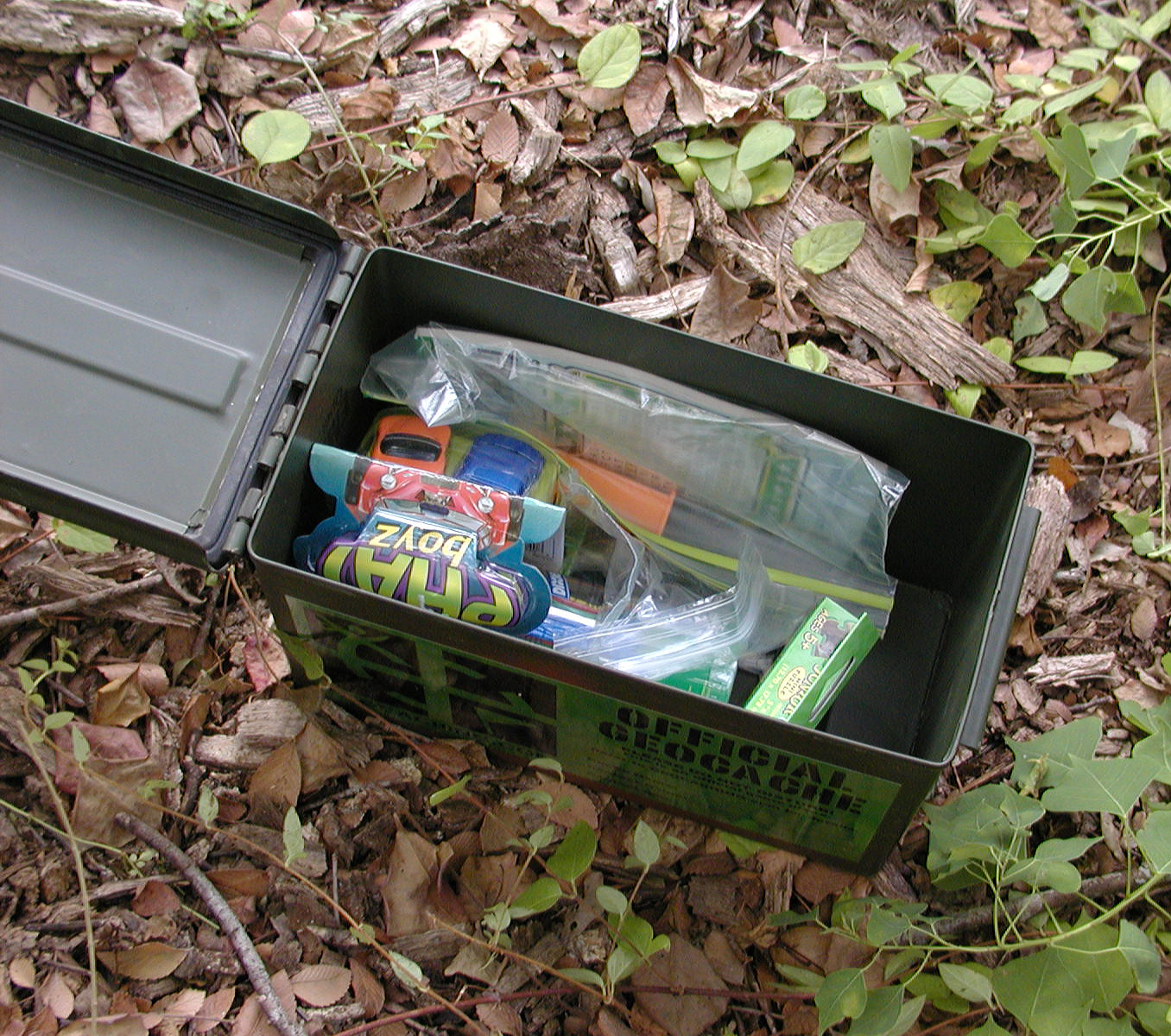
A geocache consisting of an ammo can with various trade items and a logbook

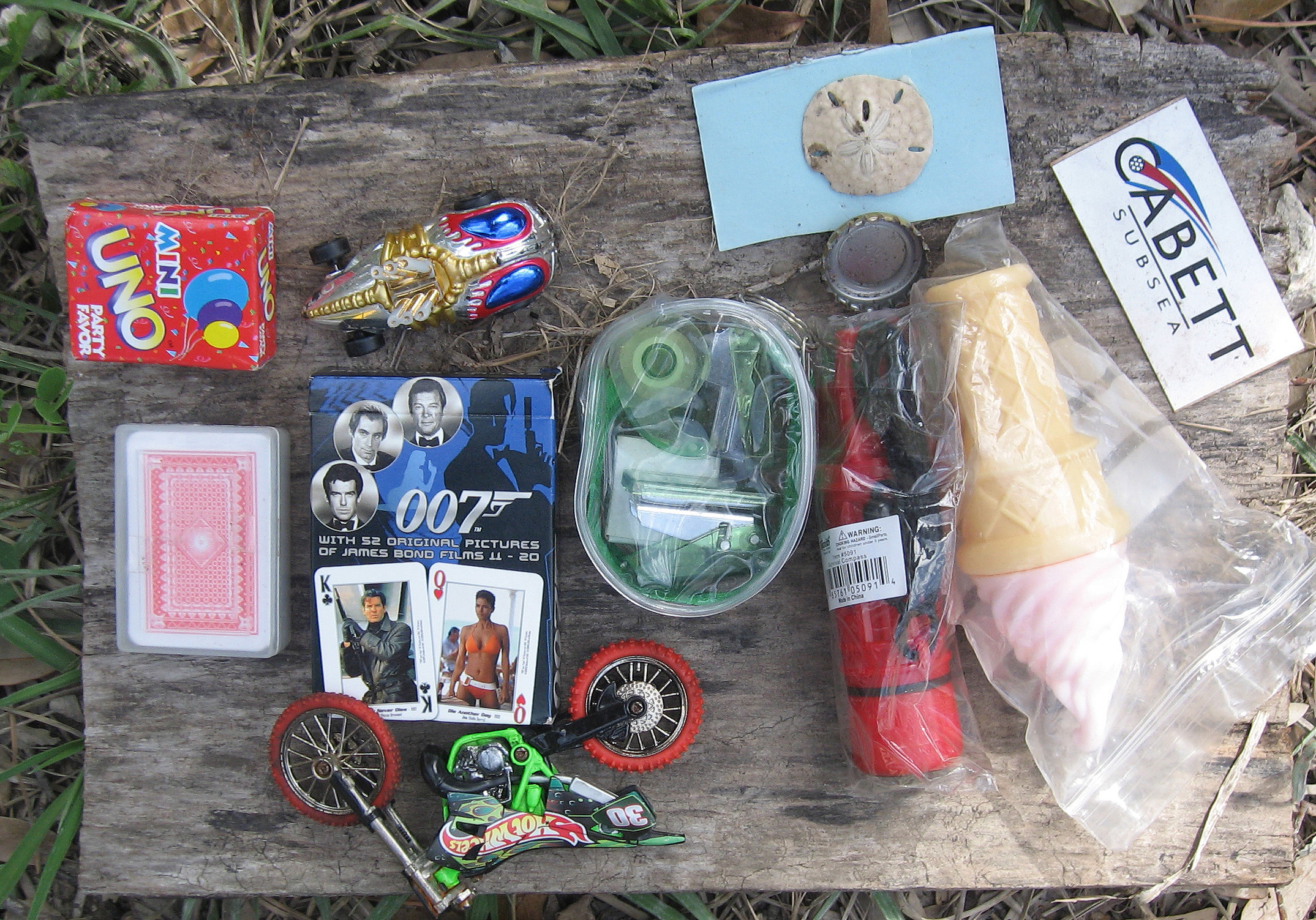
Contents of a geocache

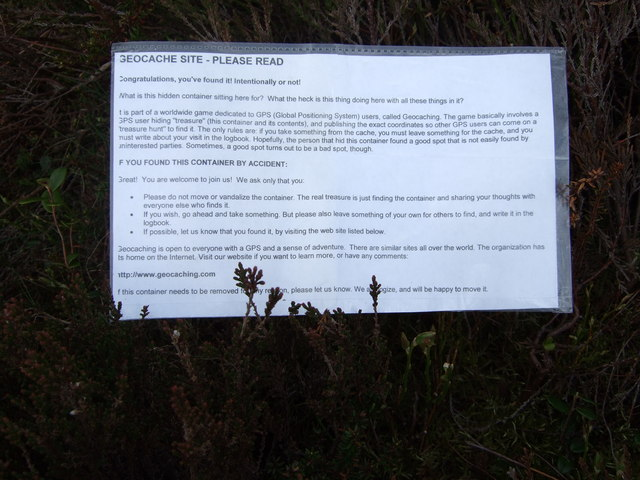
An information card explaining geocaching to accidental discoverers

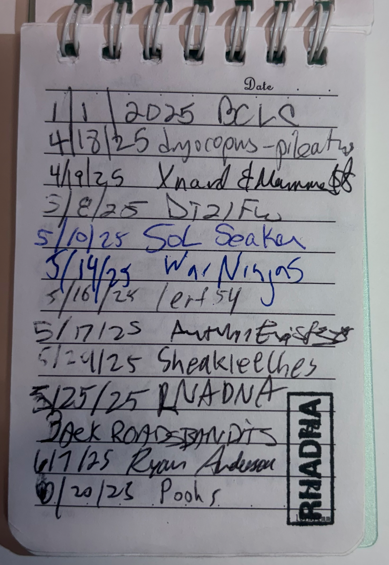
A page from a geocaching logbook

For the traditional geocache, a geocacher will place a waterproof container containing a log book, often also a pen and/or pencil and trade items or trackables, then record the cache's coordinates. These coordinates, along with other details of the location, are posted on a listing site (see list of some sites below). Other geocachers obtain the coordinates from that listing site and seek out the cache using their handheld GPS receivers (Satellite navigation device). The finding geocachers record their exploits in the logbook and online, but then must return the cache to the same coordinates so that other geocachers may find it. Geocachers are free to take objects (except the logbook, pencil, or stamp) from the cache in exchange for leaving something of similar or higher value.

Typical trading items, also known in the geocaching world as SWAG (a backronym of "stuff-we-all-get"), are not high in monetary value but may hold personal value to the finder. Aside from the logbook, common cache contents are unusual coins or currency, small toys, ornamental buttons, CDs, or books. Although not required, many geocachers decide to leave behind signature items, such as personal geocoins, pins, or craft items, to mark their presence at the cache location. Disposable cameras are popular as they allow for anyone who found the cache to take a picture which can be developed and uploaded to a geocaching web site listed below. Also common are objects that are moved from cache to cache called "hitchhikers", such as Travel Bugs or geocoins, whose travels may be logged and followed online. Cachers who initially place a Travel Bug or Geocoin(s) often assign specific goals for their trackable items. Examples of goals are to be placed in a certain cache a long distance from home, or to travel to a certain country, or to travel faster and farther than other hitchhikers in a race. Less common trends are site-specific information pages about the historic significance of the site, types of trees, birds in the area or other such information. Higher-value items are occasionally included in geocaches as a reward for the First to Find (called "FTF"), or in locations which are harder to reach.

Dangerous or illegal items, including weapons and drugs, are not allowed and are specifically against the rules of most geocache listing sites. Food is also disallowed, even if sealed, as it is considered unhygienic and can attract animals.

If a geocache has been vandalized or stolen by a person who is not familiar with geocaching, it is said to have been "muggled". The term plays off the fact that those not familiar with geocaching are called "muggles", a word borrowed from the Harry Potter series of books which were rising in popularity at the same time geocaching started.

=== Variations ===
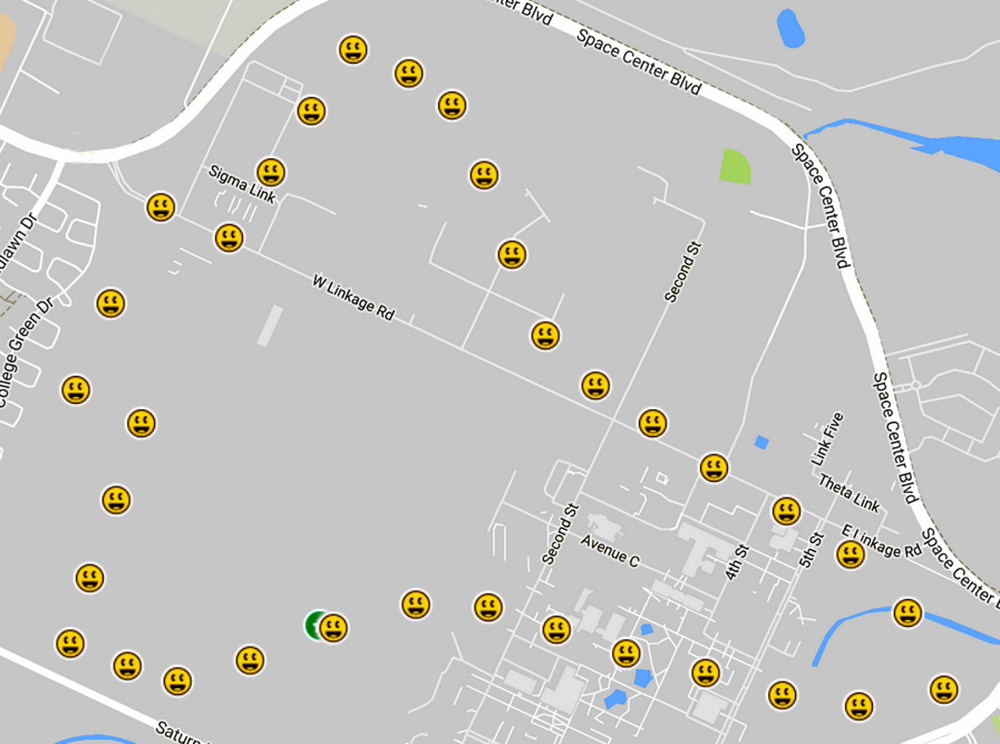
Called GeoArt, these geocaches are placed to form a picture of the Space Shuttle lying on the Johnson Space Center in Houston, United States.

Geocaches vary in size, difficulty, and location. Simple caches that are placed near a roadside are often called "drive-bys", "park 'n grabs" (PNGs), or "cache and dash". Geocaches may also be complex, involving lengthy searches, significant travel, or use of specialist equipment such as SCUBA diving, kayaking, or abseiling. Different geocaching websites list different variations per their own policies.

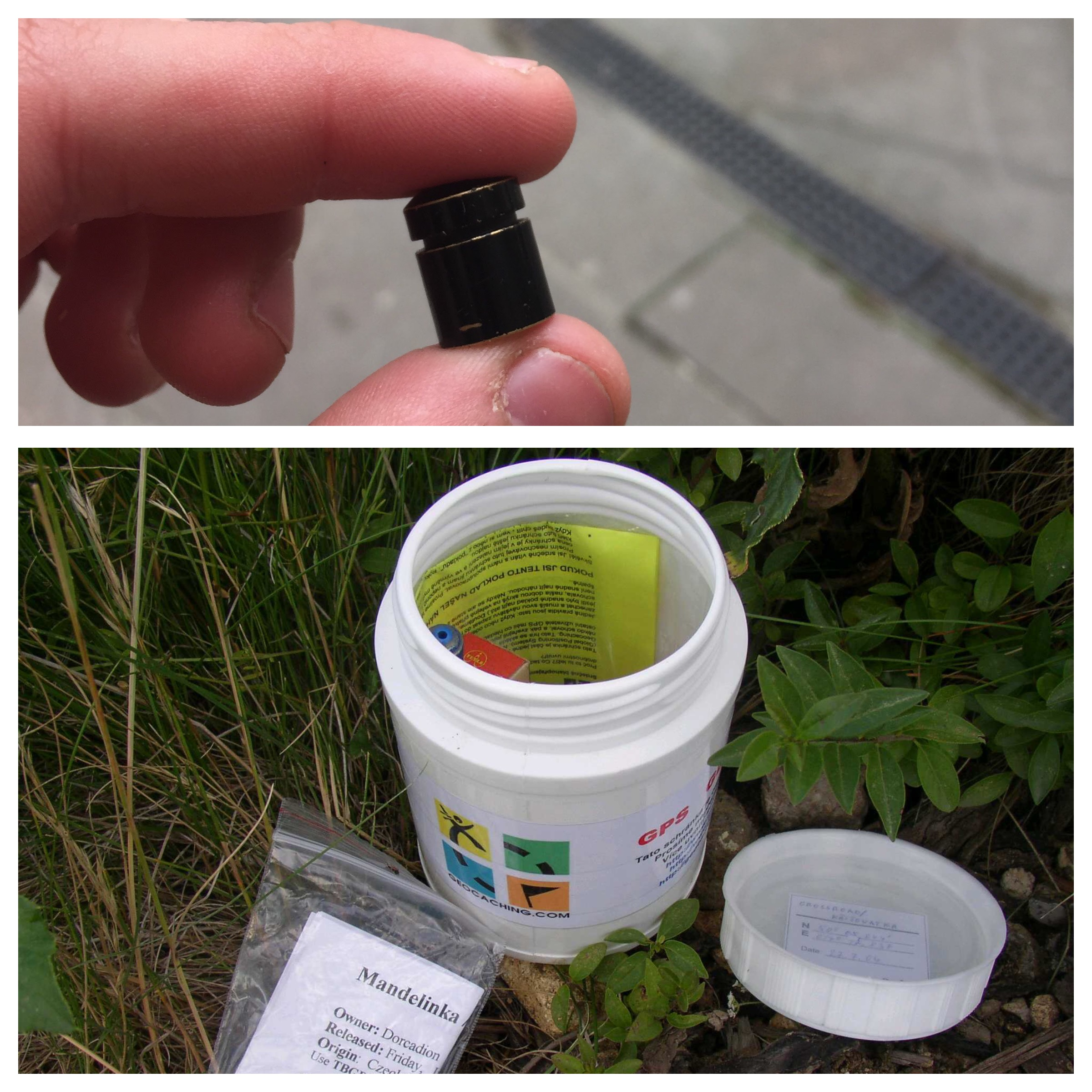
Geocaches come in a range of sizes. Top: a magnetic nano geocache in the City of London. Bottom: a large bucket geocache in the Czech Republic.

Container sizes range from nano, particularly magnetic nanos, which can be smaller than the tip of a finger and have only enough room to store the log sheet, to 20-liter (5 gallon) buckets or even larger containers, such as entire trucks. The most common cache containers in rural areas are lunch-box-sized plastic storage containers or surplus military ammunition cans. Ammo cans are considered the gold standard of containers because they are very sturdy, waterproof, animal- and fire-resistant, and relatively cheap, and have plenty of room for trade items. Smaller containers are more common in urban areas because they can be more easily hidden.

=== Geocache types ===
Over time many variations of geocaches have developed. Different platforms often have their own rules on which types are allowed or how they are classified. The following cache types are supported by geocaching.com.

==== Night cache ====
These caches are intended to be found at night, usually by use of a UV torch. These caches often have the "recommended at night" attribute and are not an official type of geocache.

==== Multi-cache ====
Multi-caches can consist of physical stages (i.e. the first stage contains coordinates for the next stage and so forth) or virtual stages (i.e. the first stage is a historical marker where geocachers have to answer questions to calculate the coordinates to the final physical container).

==== Mystery cache ====
Some puzzles can be easy and involve basic math operations or they can be quite difficult, with some of the more challenging ones requiring a firm understanding of computer programming. Geocaching Toolbox, a website dedicated to create and solve puzzle geocaches, provides a comprehensive list of common puzzle cache ciphers.

There are also some subcategories of the mystery cache, which are normally listed as a Mystery Type, which are listed below.

===== Challenge cache =====
This requires a geocacher to complete a reasonably attainable geocaching-related task before being able to log the cache as a find online. Some challenge cache owners do not restrict geocachers from finding the cache and signing the logbook at any time, others stipulate the logbook cannot be signed until the challenge requirements have been met. However, a geocacher is not allowed to log a find on the geocaching website unless they qualify for the challenge specified in the cache description. Examples include finding a number of caches that meet a category, completing a number of cache finds within a period of time, or finding a cache for every calendar day.

Since 2017, Groundspeak has required new challenges to have a geochecker in which users can put their name into an algorithm to see if they qualify without the need of physically checking all of one's previous finds. These geocheckers can be requested using the ProjectGC forums where volunteers can write and create scripts for specific challenges. Groundspeak also has been more strict into what types of challenges are published. For example, prior to 2017 it was possible to create a challenge cache to find 10 caches that have a food item in the title. Under current guidelines, this is no longer allowed because it restricts geocachers to find specific geocaches. Instead, Groundspeak has encouraged new challenges to be more creative. Acceptable challenges include finding caches in 10 states, finding 100 traditional geocaches, or finding 1000 geocaches with the "wheelchair accessible" attribute.

===== Bonus cache =====
A bonus cache requires the finder to have found an amount of caches, usually in a specific series by the same hider, before finding the bonus cache. The cache can be any type, however a bonus cache cannot be required for a second bonus cache.

===== Moving or traveling cache =====
These were found at a listed set of coordinates. The finder hides the cache in a different location, and updates the listing, essentially becoming the hider, and the next finder continues the cycle. This cache has been discontinued at geocaching.com due to many problems with maintenance, community volunteer reviewers, and with Groundspeak, and all traveling caches were archived in 2017. Since then, Groundspeak offered traveling cache owners the option to convert their cache to a trackable with its own unique icon.

===== Chirp cache =====
Also known as a wireless beacon cache. It is a variant of a multi-cache created by Garmin using wireless beacon technology. It is a physical game piece, about the size of a half-dollar that can be hidden anywhere. Powered by a small battery, it is able to transmit a signal detectable on Garmin devices. The Chirp stores hints, multicache coordinates, counts visitors, and can confirm the cache is nearby. These caches caused considerable discussion and some controversy at Groundspeak, where they were ultimately given a new "attribute". These types of geocaches can also be listed as a traditional, multi-cache, or letterbox. It is up to the cache owner to designated the cache type for wireless beacon caches.

==== Geocaching HQ geocache (GCK25B) ====
This is an official geocache located inside the Groundspeak headquarters office in Seattle, Washington. It is technically classified as a separate cache type under mystery caches, with its own unique icon both on the geocaching app and on one's profile statistics tab. Since publication in 2004, it has over 22,000 finds as of November 2025 and 22,410 finds as of June 22, 2026.

==== Wherigo cache ====
A multi-stage cache hunt that uses a Wherigo "cartridge" to guide players to find a physical cache sometime during cartridge play, usually at the end. However, not all Wherigo cartridges incorporate geocaches into gameplay. Wherigo caches are unique to the geocaching.com website. Wherigo is a GPS location-aware software platform initially released in January 2008. Authors can develop self-enclosed story files (called "cartridges") that are read by the Wherigo player software, installed on either a GPS unit or smartphone. The player and story take advantage of the location information provided by the GPS to trigger in-game events, such as using a virtual object or interacting with characters. Completing an adventure can require reaching different locations and solving puzzles. Cartridges are coded in Lua. Lua may be used directly, but a builder application is usually used. The Wherigo site offers a builder application and a database of adventures free for download, though the builder has remained in its Alpha version since its last release in May 2008. The official player is only available for Pocket PC. A built-in player is available on Garmin Colorado and Oregon GPS models. The Wherigo Foundation was organized in December 2012. The group is composed of all Wherigo application developers who, up until that time, had been acting and developing separately. Their goal is to provide a consistent Wherigo experience across platforms, connect Wherigo applications via an API, and add modern features to the Wherigo platform. While Groundspeak is aware of this project, the company has yet to take a position. The official Wherigo application has been in a broken state for years and has recently been removed entirely.

===== Reverse Wherigo =====
An RWIG provides three lines of code composed of 6 digits each that a player can type into the RWIG cartridge. Instead of following a story or interacting with characters, and RWIG gives you the distance to the final cache, but not direction. It requires geocachers to get closer to the final geocache by process of elimination. Once you are within 25 metres, the final coordinates are given to provide a more accurate location for the geocache.

==== Letterbox hybrid ====
This is a combination of a geocache and a letterbox in the same container. Letterboxes involve a rubber stamp and logbook that are not supposed to be traded and taken instead of tradable items, but letterbox hybrids may or may not include trade items. Letterboxers carry their own stamp with them, to stamp the letterbox's logbook and inversely stamp their personal logbook with the letterbox stamp. The letterbox hybrid cache contains the important materials for this. Typically, letterbox hybrid caches are not found at the given coordinates which only act as a starting location. Instead, a series of clues are given as to where to find the cache such as "take a left past the bridge" or "about 25 paces past the big oak tree".

==== Project A.P.E. cache ====
Also known as A.P.E. caches, these are a special type of traditional cache that were hidden in conjunction with 20th Century Fox and Groundspeak to promote the 2001 remake of Planet of the Apes. There were 14 A.P.E. geocaches placed around the world and each one contained a prop from the film. As of 2023, only 2 A.P.E. caches are still active with one near Seattle, Washington United States ('Tunnel of Light', GC1169) and the other in the Intervales State Park, in Brazil ('Southern Bowl', GCC67). Of those two, the "Southern Bowl" A.P.E. cache is the only surviving original A.P.E. cache because "Tunnel of Light" was muggled in 2016. However, the original container was later found by a Groundspeak led survey in April of that year. What remains of "Tunnel of Light" is an "official" replacement of the original ammo can that was left in 2001.

==== Virtual cache ====
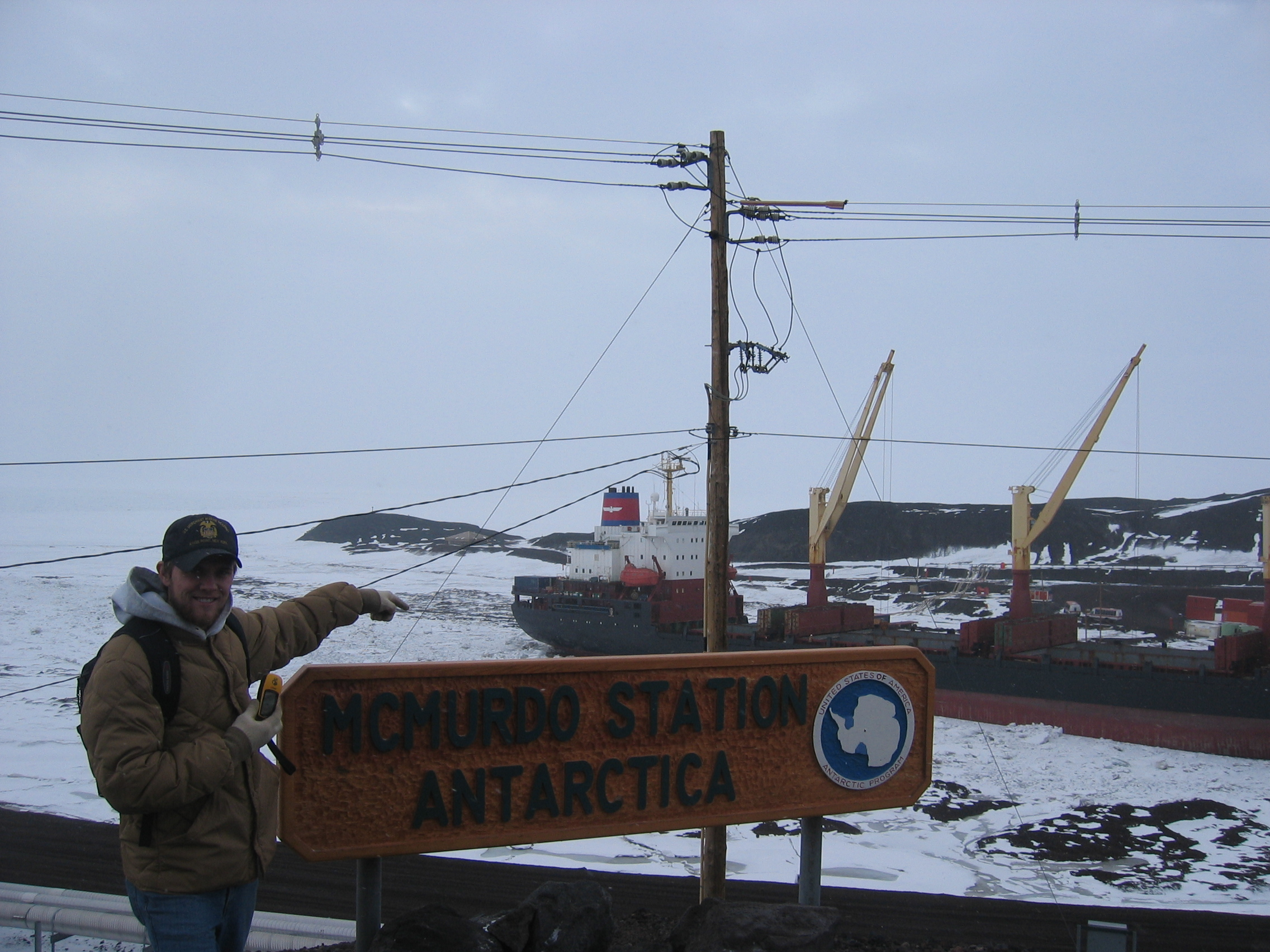
A geocacher finding a virtual cache at McMurdo Station, Antarctica

This cache type does not contain a physical logbook. They are normally hidden at a rather interesting or unique location, usually with a described object such as an art sculpture or a scenic lookout. Validation for finding a virtual cache generally requires one to email the cache hider with information such as a date or a name on a plaque, or to post a picture of oneself at the site with a GPS receiver in hand. As of 2005, new virtual caches are no longer allowed to be published by Groundspeak as it is considered a legacy cache.

On August 24, 2017, Groundspeak announced "Virtual Rewards", allowing 4000 new virtual caches to be placed during the following year. Groundspeak also offered Virtual Rewards 2.0, 3.0, 4.0, and 5.0 on June 4, 2019, March 1, 2022, January 17, 2024, and February 3, 2025, respectively. Each year, eligible geocachers can opt-in to a drawing and some selected with the opportunity to submit a virtual cache for publication. From 2005 to 2017, the geocaching website no longer listed new caches without a physical container, including virtual and webcam caches (with the exception of EarthCaches and events); however, older caches of these types have been grandfathered.

==== EarthCache ====
Similar to virtual geocaches, an EarthCache is published not by a local reviewer, but by a volunteer regional reviewer associated with the Geological Society of America. The geocacher usually has to perform a task which teaches an education lesson about the geology of the cache area. Visitors must answer geological questions to complete the cache which can be as simple as describing the color and thickness of layers in an outcrop or can be as complicated as taking measurements of stream velocities or fault offsets. EarthCaches covers geologic topics such as: rock formation, mineralogy, earthquakes, fluvial processes, erosion, volcanology, and planetary science (among others).

==== Locationless cache ====
Otherwise known as a Reverse cache, a locationless cache is similar to a scavenger hunt. A description is given for something to find, such as a one-room schoolhouse, and the finder locates an example of this object. The finder records the location using their GPS receiver and often takes a picture at the location showing the named object with their GPS receiver. Typically others are not allowed to log that same location as a find.

Since 2005, all locationless caches have been archived and locked, meaning they are unable to be logged. However, with geocaching's 20th anniversary in 2020 Groundspeak decided to publish a special locationless cache for geocachers to "find" at various Mega- and Giga-Events around the world. The first locationless cache in 15 years (GC8FR0G) required finders to take a picture of themselves with the geocaching mascot, Signal the Frog, at Mega- and Giga-Events during 2020. The cache was made available to log starting January 1, 2020. However, because of the COVID-19 pandemic, nearly all planned Mega- and Giga-events were canceled for the year, including the planned 20th anniversary celebration event in Seattle, Washington. Therefore, Groundspeak decided to extend the deadline to log this geocache through January 1, 2023. With 22,500 finds it is the second most logged geocache in history.

The second published locationless cache since 2005 (GC8NEAT) required visitors to take a photo of them picking up trash and cleaning up their local area. Geocachers were able to log this cache from February 6, 2021, through December 31, 2022. It has been logged over 33,500 times and holds the title for the most "found" geocache. On August 17, 2022, Geocaching.com made available the third locationless cache to be logged since 2005 (GC9FAVE). Instead of finding Signal or picking up trash, this cache encouraged geocachers from around the world to share their favorite geocaching story. This geocache was archived and locked on January 1, 2024. In 2025, Geocaching.com announced the fourth locationless cache since 2005 (GCA2025). In honor of the 25th anniversary of geocaching, geocachers were encouraged to take a photo next to a pre-existing number 25.

==== Webcam cache ====
A type of virtual cache whose coordinates provide the location to a public webcam. The finder is required to capture an image of themselves through the webcam for verification of the find. New webcam caches are no longer allowed by Groundspeak as it is a legacy cache. Webcam caches are a category at Waymarking.com.

==== Adventure Lab ====
A type of virtual cache that typically consists of a set of 5 waypoints, with each waypoint counting as a "cache find". The waypoints usually have an overall theme such as showcasing the history of a small town and are often created as a walking tour of a city or park. An example would be Route 66 or the Lincoln Highway, which are a nationwide series of Adventure Lab sets of 10 that stretch the entire route across the United States.

Adventure labs were first introduced in 2014 as a way to test market ideas through Groundspeak. Initially, geocachers would find a key word at a designated site where they could then enter it onto a website to claim "credit". Soon after, they were made available to "find" at select Mega-Events. In 2020, Groundspeak released the "Adventure Lab" app, separate from the geocaching app. The app made it possible to enter a geo-fence when, once inside, a question will appear that can be answered either in the form of a written answer or a multiple choice answer. This question can be answered at anytime once activated, however, some Adventure Labs must be completed sequentially implying that one must answer the question to move on to the next waypoint.

Many Adventure Labs caches have a physical bonus cache associated with them that are listed as a "mystery cache". Coordinates to the bonus cache, if applicable, can be seen in the journal entries once a user has correctly answered the question at a waypoint.

Geocachers can create their own Adventure Lab, but must first opt-in to receive an "Adventure Lab credit" which allows for the creation of 1 set of 5 waypoints, with each of the 5 waypoints counting towards a cache find. If selected, Adventure Labs can be created using the Adventure Lab builder. Adventure Labs, unlike all other geocaches, are not subject to review and are published at will by the creator. However, Adventure Labs can at anytime be archived by Groundspeak if they are in violation of terms of use. For example, placing an Adventure Lab in a place that requires people to pay a fee to visit such as airports or theme parks may get the Adventure permanently removed from the Adventure Lab app.

==== Event caches ====
There are several kinds of events geocaches. While encouraged, events do not require visitors to sign a logbook to prove they attended an event. Attendees of event caches can log that they 'attended', which will increase their number of found caches. Event caches can be of the following types:

- Event: Event caches have to be longer than 30 minutes, and can publish no less than 14 days away from the planned event date. Event caches typically last from 1 to 2 hours.
- Cache-In Trash-Out Event (CITO): CITO events must be no less than 1 hour long. Just like event caches, CITOs have to be published no less than 14 days prior to the date of the CITO. CITO typically last from 2 to 4 hours.
- Mega-Event: Just like an event cache, however it has to have at least 300 "Will Attend" logs before it can be considered for Mega-Event status. You must submit an application to Groundspeak before events can become Megas. Previous Mega-Events must have at least 300 "Will Attends" before events can be Megas in future years. Mega events are typically organized by local geocache organizations in conjunction with local municipalities and promotion from Groundspeak. Often, Mega events last an entire day and have various activities planned in the days before, during, and after the main Mega-Event. These activities can range in raffles and silent auctions, of which funds help offset the costs of organizing such an event, photo ops with Signal the Frog, a plethora of new geocaches, and panels with local geocachers, lackeys (Groundspeak employees), and reviewers. Mega-Events often have vendors where people can purchase geocoins, cache containers, and food.
- Giga-Event: Just like an event cache, however it has to consist of 5,000 or more geocachers. Like a Mega-Event, Giga-Events offer a plethora of actives and are typically held in large areas to accommodate such crowds. Activities typically include a GPS Adventures Maze, panels, vendors, live music, and carnival rides. Usually the week before and after are filled with smaller gatherings which attracts geocachers from around the world who often make a vacation out of it. Only one can happen at a time in the world.
- Community Celebration Event (CCE): A type of event that is meant to celebrate the 10th, 20th and 25th anniversary of geocaching. First issued in 2010 as "Lost and Found" events, geocachers could host one to celebrate the 10-year anniversary of geocaching. In preparation for the 20th anniversary in 2020, Lost and Found events were rebranded as Community Celebration Events. Geocachers could opt-in to receive a CCE credit to host. Due to the COVID-19 pandemic, Groundspeak allowed CCEs to be hosted until December 31, 2022. In 2025, Geocaching HQ allowed geocachers to host CCEs in 2025, assuming they meet specific criteria.
- Geocaching HQ Block Party: First hosted at Geocaching HQ in 2011 and 2015, a Geocaching HQ Block party is hosted at significant milestones for Geocaching's years of existence. In 2025, Groundspeak made the Geocaching HQ Block Party icon available for Mega/Giga Event organizers to use assuming they met specific criteria. This was to celebrate Geocaching's 25th anniversary.

== Technology ==
=== Obtaining data ===
GPX files containing information such as a cache description and information about recent visitors to the cache are available from the Geocache page and from various listing sites. Geocachers may upload geocache data (also known as waypoints) from various websites in various formats, most commonly in file-type GPX, which uses XML.To download and use GPX data from a geocache page, you must agree to a license (You can see the archived license agreement in the [65] and [64] cite). Some websites allow geocachers to search (build queries) for multiple caches within a geographic area based on criteria such as ZIP code or coordinates, downloading the results as an email attachment on a schedule. In recent years, Android and iPhone users can download apps such as GeoBeagle that allow them to use their 3G and GPS-enabled devices to actively search for and download new caches.

=== Converting and filtering data ===
A variety of geocaching applications are available for geocache data management, file-type translation, and personalization. Geocaching software can assign special icons or search (filter) for caches based on certain criteria (e.g. distance from an assigned point, difficulty, date last found).

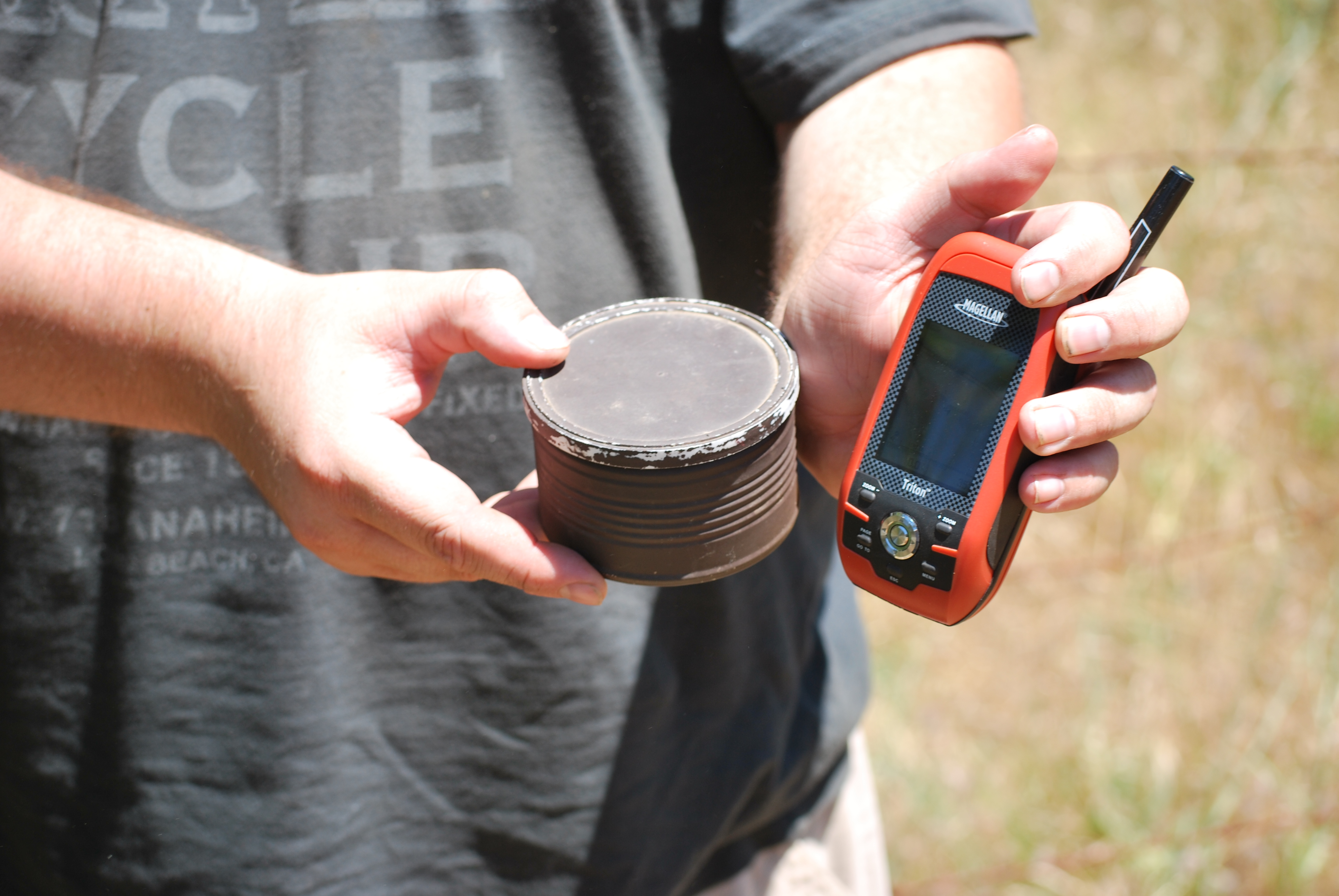
Coordinates for a geocache can be downloaded onto a GPS receiver and found, without the need for a printout.

Paperless geocaching means hunting a geocache without a physical printout of the cache description. Traditionally, this means that the seeker has an electronic means of viewing the cache information in the field, such as pre-downloading the information to a PDA or other electronic device. Various applications can directly upload and read GPX files without further conversion. Newer GPS devices released by Garmin, DeLorme, and Magellan have the ability to read GPX files directly, thus eliminating the need for a PDA. Other methods include viewing real-time information on a portable computer with internet access or with an Internet-enabled smart phone. The latest advancement of this practice involves installing dedicated applications on a smart phone with a built-in GPS receiver. Seekers can search for and download caches in their immediate vicinity directly to the application and use the on-board GPS receiver to find the cache.

A more controversial version of paperless Caching involves mass-downloading only the coordinates and cache names (or waypoint IDs) for hundreds of caches into older receivers. This is a common practice of some cachers and has been used successfully for years. In many cases, however, the cache description and hint are never read by the seeker before hunting the cache. This means they are unaware of potential restrictions such as limited hunt times, park open/close times, off-limit areas, and suggested parking locations.

=== Mobile devices ===
The website geocaching.com now sells mobile applications which allow users to view caches through a variety of different devices. Currently, the Android, iOS, and Windows Phone mobile platforms have applications in their respective stores. The apps also allow for a trial version with limited functionality. The site promotes mobile applications, and lists over two dozen applications (both mobile and browser/desktop based) that are using their proprietary but royalty-free public application programming interface (API). Developers at c:geo have criticized Groundspeak for being incompatible with open-source development.

Additionally, "c:geo" is a free opensource full function application for Android phones. This app includes similar features to the official Geocaching mobile application, such as: View caches on a live map (Google Maps or OpenStreetMap), navigation using a compass, map, or other applications, logging finds online and offline, etc.

Geocaching enthusiasts have also made their own hand-held GPS devices using a Lego Mindstorms NXT GPS sensor.

== Reception ==
The reception from both authorities and the general public outside geocache participants has been mixed.

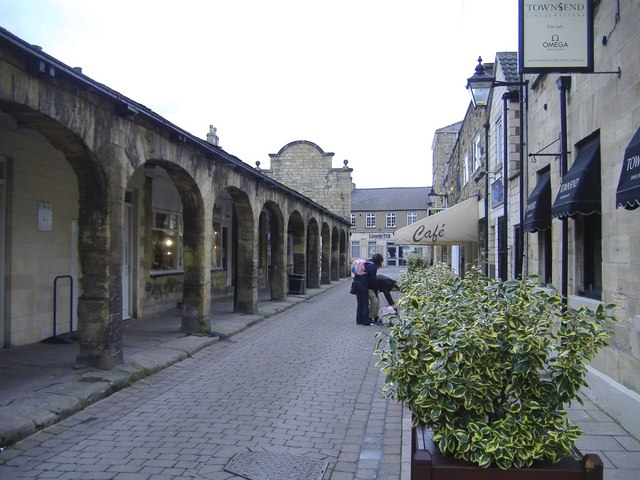
The Shambles, a road in Wetherby, Yorkshire, England, was the site of a controlled explosion on a geocache container in 2011 which was mistakenly perceived to be a bomb.

Cachers have been approached by police and questioned when they were seen as acting suspiciously. Other times, investigation of a cache location after suspicious activity was reported has resulted in police and bomb squad discovery of the geocache, such as the evacuation of a busy street in Wetherby, Yorkshire, England in 2011, and a street in Alvaston, Derby in 2020.

Schools have been evacuated when a cache has been seen by teachers or police, such as the case of Fairview High School in Boulder, Colorado United States in 2009. A number of caches have been destroyed by bomb squads. Diverse locations, from rural cemeteries to Disneyland, have been locked down as a result of such scares.

The placement of geocaches has occasional critics among some government personnel and the public at large, who consider it littering. Some geocachers act to mitigate this perception by picking up litter while they search for geocaches, a practice referred to in the community as "Cache In Trash Out". Events and caches are often organized revolving around this practice, with many areas seeing significant cleanup that would otherwise not take place, or would instead require federal, state, or local funds to accomplish. Geocachers are also encouraged to clean up after themselves by retrieving old containers once a cache has been removed from play.

Geocaching is legal in most countries and is usually positively received when explained to law enforcement officials. However, certain types of placements can be problematic. Although generally disallowed, hiders could place caches on private property without adequate permission (intentionally or otherwise), which encourages cache finders to trespass. Historic buildings and structures have also been damaged by geocachers, who have wrongly believed the geocache can be/has been placed within, or on the roof of, the buildings. Caches might also be hidden in places where the act of searching can make a finder look suspicious (e.g., near schools, children's playgrounds, banks, courthouses, or in residential neighborhoods), or where the container placement could be mistaken for a drug stash or a bomb (especially in urban settings, under bridges, near banks, courthouses, or embassies). As a result, geocachers are strongly advised to label their geocaches when possible, so that they are not mistaken for a harmful object if discovered by non-geocachers.

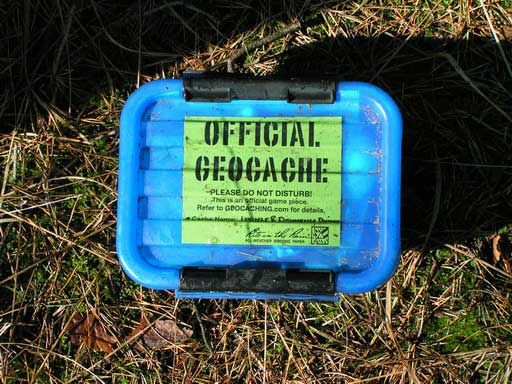
A geocache that has been clearly labeled, to clarify that the container is harmless, intending to reduce alarm if it is accidentally discovered

As well as concerns about littering and bomb threats, some geocachers have hidden their caches in inappropriate locations, such as electrical boxes, which may encourage risky behavior, especially by children. Hides in these areas are discouraged, and cache listing websites enforce guidelines that disallow certain types of placements. However, as cache reviewers typically cannot see exactly where and how every cache is hidden, problematic hides can slip through. Ultimately it is also up to cache finders to use discretion when attempting to search for a cache, and report any problems.

=== Laws and legislation ===
Regional rules for placement of caches have become complex. For example, in the state of Virginia, the Virginia Department of Transportation and the Wildlife Management Agency now forbids the placement of geocaches on all land controlled by those agencies. Some cities, towns, and recreation areas allow geocaches with few or no restrictions, but others require compliance with lengthy permitting procedures.

The South Carolina House of Representatives passed Bill 3777 in 2005, stating, "It is unlawful for a person to engage in the activity of Geocaching or letterboxing in a cemetery or in a historic or archaeological site or property publicly identified by a historical marker without the express written consent of the owner or entity which oversees that cemetery site or property." The bill was referred to committee on first reading in the Senate and has been there ever since.

The Illinois Department of Natural Resources requires geocachers who wish to place a geocache at any Illinois state park to submit the location on a USGS 7.5-minute topographical map, the name and contact information of the person(s) wishing to place the geocache, a list of the original items to be included in the geocache, and a picture of the container that is to be placed.

In April 2020, during the COVID-19 pandemic, the township of Highlands East, Ontario, Canada temporarily banned geocaching, over concerns that geocache containers could not be properly disinfected between finds.

== Websites and data ownership ==
Numerous websites list geocaches around the world. Geocaching websites vary in many ways, such as subscription options, activity levels, and volunteers available to check and ensure caches registered remain open for others.

=== Geocaching.com ===
The largest site is Geocaching.com, owned by Groundspeak Inc., which began operating in late 2000. With a worldwide membership and a freemium business model, the website claims millions of caches and members in over 190 countries and all seven continents including Antarctica. Hides and events are reviewed by volunteer regional cache reviewers before publication. Free membership allows users access to coordinates, descriptions, and logs for some caches; for a subscription fee, users are allowed additional search tools, the ability to download large amounts of cache information onto their GPS at once, instant email notifications about new caches, and access to premium-member-only caches. Geocaching Headquarters are located in the Fremont neighborhood of Seattle, Washington, United States.

=== Opencaching Network ===
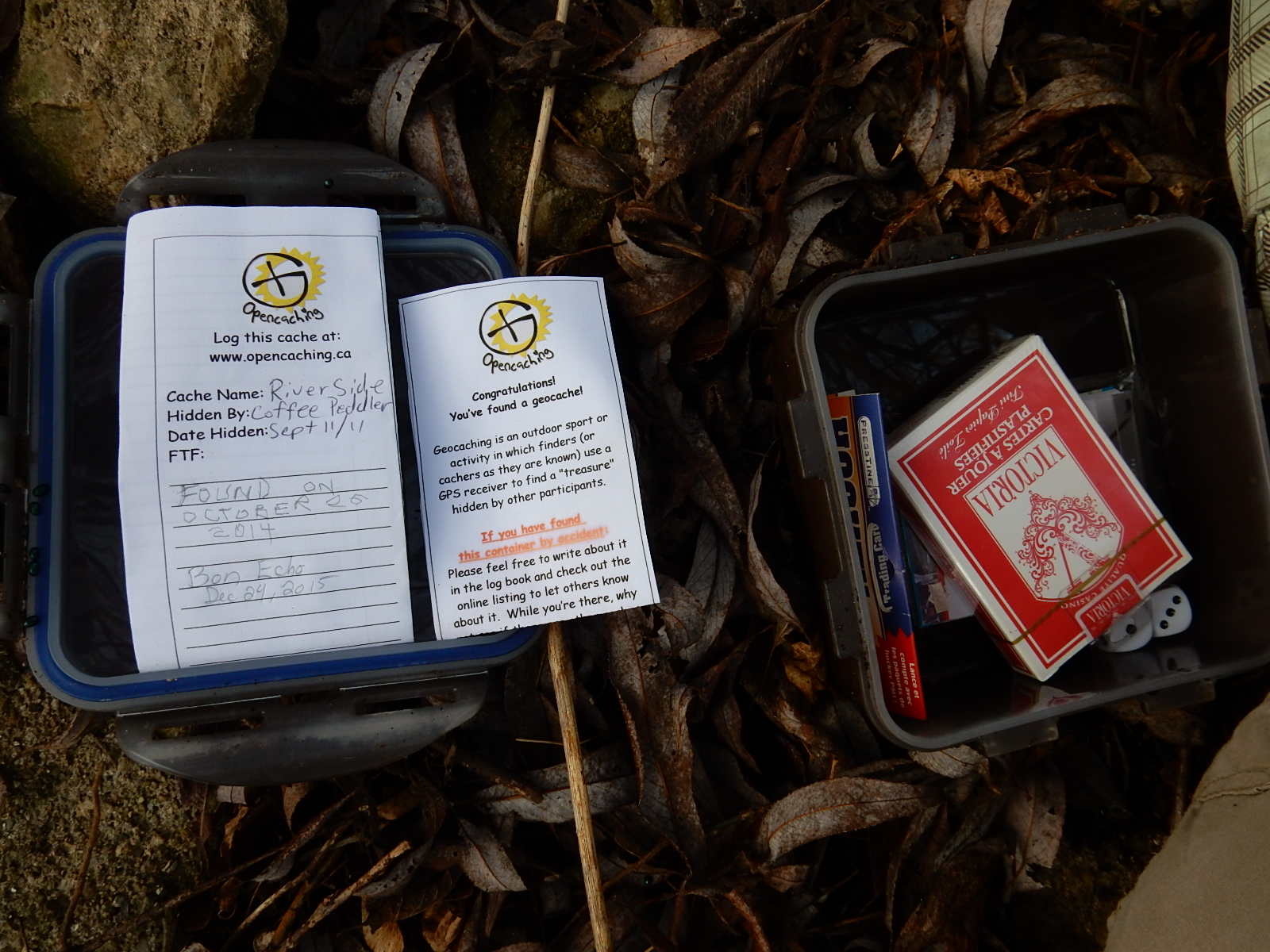
A geocache hidden through the Opencaching website

The Opencaching Network provides independent, non-commercial listing sites based in the cacher's country or region. The Opencaching Network lists the most types of caches, including traditional, virtual, moving, multi, quiz, webcam, BIT, guest book, USB, event, and MP3. The Opencaching Network is less restrictive than many sites, and does not charge for the use of the sites, the service being community-driven.

As opposed to Geocaching.com, cross-listing is permitted—that is, listing caches on both Opencaching as another network, like Geocaching.com. Many of Opencaching's caches are unique to the Opencaching Network, however. Some of the functions on the Opencaching Network include the following:

- The ability to organize one's favorite caches
- Build custom searches
- Be instantly notified of new caches in one's area
- Seek and create caches of all types
- Export GPX queries
- Making statpics

Each Opencaching Node uses a free shared API (called "OKAPI") for use by developers who want to create third-party applications that use the Opencaching Network's content.

At this time, the following Opencaching websites exist:

- https://opencaching.nl (Benelux)
- https://opencaching.de (Multiple countries, especially German-speaking but also France, Italy and Spain)
- https://opencaching.pl (Poland)
- https://opencaching.ro (Romania)
- https://opencache.uk (United Kingdom)
- https://opencaching.us (USA / Canada / Mexico)

=== OpenCaching.com ===
OpenCaching.com (short: OX) was a site created and run by Garmin from 2010 to 2015, which had the stated aim of being as free and open as possible with no paid content. Caches were approved by a community process and coordinates were available without an account. The service closed on August 14, 2015.

=== Other sites ===
In many countries there are regional geocaching sites, but these mostly only compile lists of caches in the area from the three main sites. Many of them also accept unique listings of caches for their site; these listings tend to be less popular than the international sites, although occasionally the regional sites may have more caches than the international sites. There are some exceptions, such as how, in the territory of the former Soviet Union, the site Geocaching.su remains popular because it accepts listings in the Cyrillic script. Additional international sites include Geocaching.de, a German website, and Geocaching Australia, which accepts listings of cache types deprecated by geocaching.com, cache types such as TrigPoint and Moveable caches, as well as traditional geocache types.

==== GPSgames ====
GPSgames.org was an online community dedicated to all kinds of games involving Global Positioning System receivers. GPSgames.org allowed traditional geocaches along with virtual, locationless, and traveler geocaches. The site's geodashing game generated a large number of randomly positioned "dashpoints", requiring players to reach as many as possible, competing as individuals or teams. Shutterspot, GeoVexilla, MinuteWar, GeoPoker, and GeoGolf were among the other GPS games available.

GPSgames.org was 100% free since 2001, through donations. The site was retired on June 30, 2021.

==== NaviCache ====
Navicache.com started as a regional listing service in 2001. While many of the website's listings have been posted to other sites, it also offers unique listings. The website lists nearly any type of geocache and does not charge to access any of the caches listed in its database. All submissions are reviewed and approved. In 2012 it was announced that Navicache was under transition to new owners, who said they "plan to develop a site that geocachers want, with rules that geocachers think are suitable. Geocaching.com and OX are both backed by large enterprises, and while that means they have more funding and people, we're a much smaller team – so our advantage is the ability to be dynamic and listen to the users." However, as of 2021 the site is mostly dormant, and the most recent cache listing is from 2014.

==== TerraCaching ====
Terracaching.com aims to provide high-quality caches made so by the difficulty of the hide or from the quality of the location. Membership is managed through a sponsorship system, and each cache is under continual peer review from other members. Terracaching.com embraces virtual caches alongside traditional or multi-stage caches and includes many locationless caches among the thousands of caches in its database. It is increasingly attracting members who like the point system. In Europe, TerraCaching is supported by Terracaching.eu. This site is translated in different European languages, has an extended FAQ and extra supporting tools for TerraCaching. TerraCaching strongly discourages caches that are listed on other sites (so-called double-listing).

==== Extremcaching ====
Extremcaching is a German private database for alternative geocaches with a focus on T5 / climbing caches, night caches, and lost place caches.

==== Geocaching Australia ====
Geocaching Australia is a community website for geocachers in Australia and New Zealand. Geocaching Australia also has many unique cache types such as Burke And Wills, Moveable_cache & Podcache geocaches.

== See also ==
- Benchmarking
- Geohashing
- Letterboxing (hobby)
- Location-based game
- Munzee
- Orienteering
- Treasure hunting
