= Real estate development =

Process that creates or renovates new or existing spaces

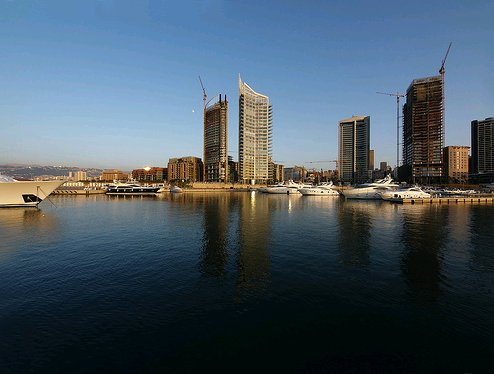
The Solidere development of the Beirut seafront and harbor

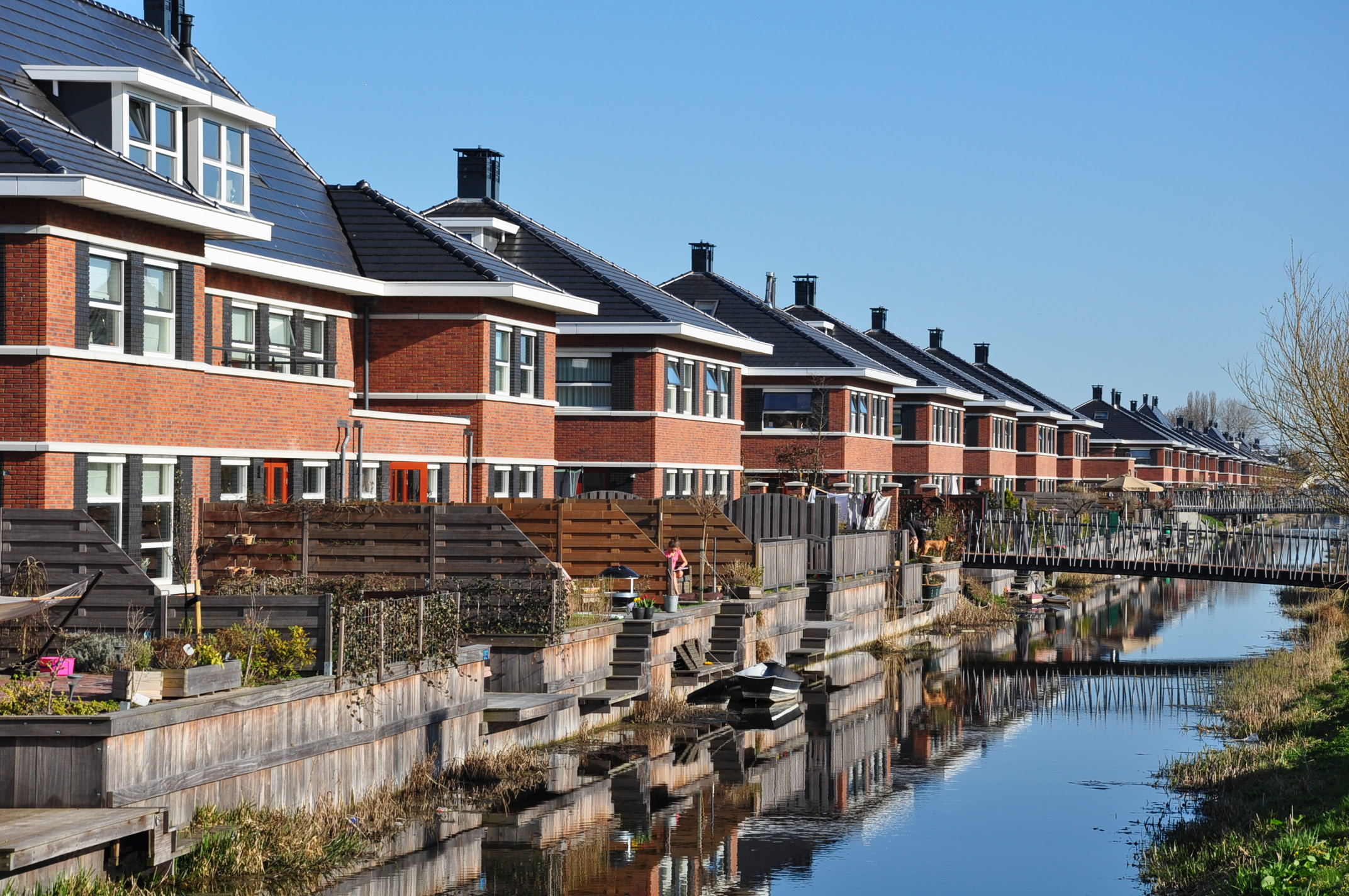
In the Netherlands, virtually all housing is developed and built through property developers, including development in upmarket segments.

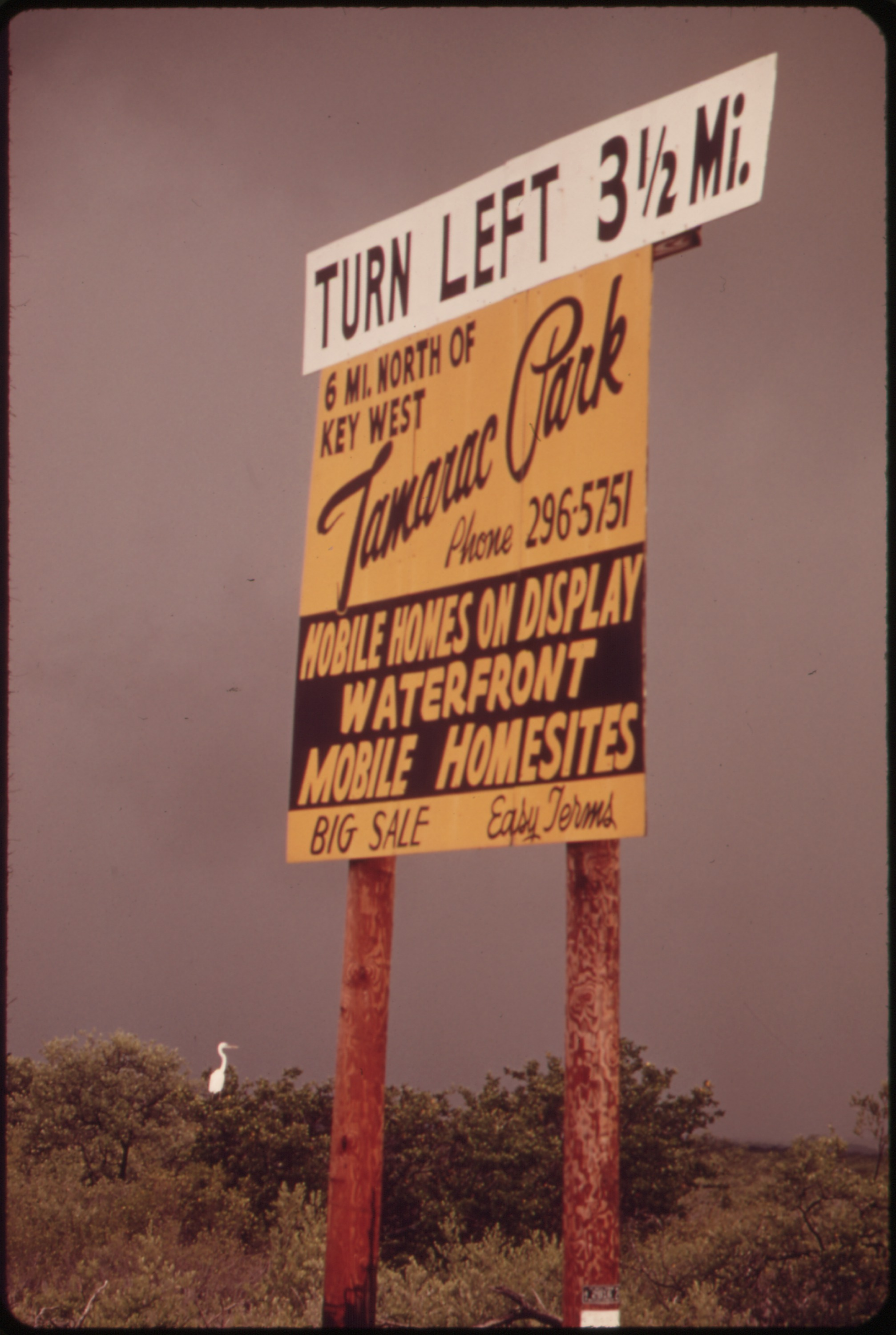
Mobile homes development in the Florida Keys, June 1973

Real estate development is the process of acquiring land or existing property, improving it through planning and construction, and selling or leasing for profit. It involves coordinating design, financing, approvals, construction, and marketing. Developers assume significant risk in exchange for potential returns and may oversee projects ranging from residential housing to commercial and mixed-use developments. A real estate developer deals with real estate development

Developers acquire land, arrange financing, obtain regulatory approvals, and oversee construction or renovation. Developers usually take significant financial risks in the creation or renovation of real estate and receive the greatest rewards. Typically, developers purchase a tract of land, determine the marketing of the property, develop the building program and design, obtain the necessary public approval and financing, build the structures, and rent out, manage, and ultimately sell it.

Real estate development has been criticized for contributing to urban sprawl and environmental degradation. Supporters argue that development expands housing supply, reduces housing costs, stimulates economic growth and creates jobs. Lower construction costs, land prices and regulation costs tend to increase real estate construction.

Some developers only handle part of the process. For example, some developers source a property and get the plans and permits approved before selling the property with the plans and permits to a builder at a premium price. Alternatively, a developer who is also a builder may purchase a property with the plans and permits in place so that they do not have the risk of failing to obtain planning approval and can start construction on the development immediately. Financial difficulties in development and investing differ because of leverage.

Supply and demand curves with economic equilibrium of price and quantity apply to real estate development

Developers work with many different counterparts along each step of this process, including architects, city planners, engineers, surveyors, inspectors, contractors, lawyers, leasing agents, etc. In the Town and Country Planning context in the United Kingdom, “development” is defined in the Town and Country Planning Act 1990 s55.

== Organizing for development ==
Development teams vary in size, bigger companies may provide all services in-house. At the other end of the spectrum, a development company might consist of one principal and a few staff who hire or contract with other companies and professionals for each service as needed.

Assembling a team of professionals to address the environmental, economic, private, physical and political issues inherent in a complex development project is critical. A developer's success depends on the ability to coordinate and lead the completion of a series of interrelated activities efficiently and at the appropriate time.

Development process requires skills of many professionals: architects, landscape architects, civil engineers and site planners to address project design; market consultants to determine demand and a project's economics; attorneys to handle agreements and government approvals; environmental consultants and soils engineers to analyze a site's physical limitations and environmental impacts; surveyors and title companies to provide legal descriptions of a property; and lenders to provide financing. The general contractor of the project hires subcontractors to put the architectural plans into action.

== Land development ==
Purchasing unused land for a potential development is sometimes called speculative development.

Subdivision of land is the principal mechanism by which communities are developed. Technically, subdivision describes the legal and physical steps a developer must take to convert raw land into developed land. Subdivision is a vital part of a community's growth, determining its appearance, the mix of its land uses, and its infrastructure, including roads, drainage systems, water, sewerage, and public utilities.

Land development is risky because it depends on outside approval and infrastructure and often requires a long investment time period without cash flow.

After subdivision is complete, the developer usually markets the land to a home builder or other end user, for such uses as a warehouse or shopping center. In any case, use of spatial intelligence tools mitigate the risk of these developers by modeling the population trends and demographic make-up of the sort of customers a home builder or retailer would like to have surrounding their new development.

== See also ==
- Affordable housing
- Brownfield regulation and development
- Land consumption
- NIMBY
- Property Management
- Real estate business
- Shared ranch
- Urban renewal
- Urban sprawl
- YIMBY movement
