= Mobile local search =

Technology term

Mobile local search is a technology that lets people search for local things using mobile equipment such as mobile phones, PDAs, and other mobile devices. Mobile local search satisfies the need to offer a mobile subscriber spontaneous access to near-position services and information such as businesses, products, events, restaurant, movie theatre or other local information. Mobile local search is the search and discovery of persons, places, and things within an identifiable space defined by distinct parameters. These parameters are evolving. Today they include social networks, individuals, cities, neighborhoods, landmarks, and actions that are relevant to the searcher's past, current, and future location. These parameters provide structure to vertically deep and horizontally broad data categories that can stand-alone or are combined to comprise searchable directories.

Mobile local search is usually based on organized directories accessed through specialized search tools, rather than the web, although mobile local search often provides links to mobile (WAP) web sites. It is also an application of a location-based service.

== Technology ==
Mobile local search involves in some cases GPS tracking, which, without prior consent, may cause privacy concerns. Furthermore, early surveys expected merely 10% of mobile devices worldwide to be equipped with GPS chips by 2011.

Alternatively, mobile local search could also be done without mobile operators and GPS systems involved. This was possible through access to the SS7 protocol, which mobile operators have. However, having access via the mobile operator was very hard since the mobile operators sold it at a premium rate, if at all.

Although GPS-enabled devices were not prevalent initially, industry experts showed that consumers were demanding mobile local search, with an expected growth of 91% from 2007 to 2011. As a consequence, there was a gap in this opportunity that could be addressed by mobile operators and service providers with access to the SS7 layer. Today, GPS technology is ubiquitous in modern smartphones, largely replacing the need for SS7-based tracking for local search.

== Access methods ==
Mobile local search may be screen-based using the keypad and display on the mobile device, or voice-based using spoken commands that are interpreted by a speech recognition application.

Screen-based search using the keypad to enter search terms into a form on the mobile screen is the most common access method today. It has the advantages of working in a noisy environment and avoiding speech interpretation problems. But the user has to enter search terms using a small keypad typical of most mobile devices, with results displayed on a small screen. Screen-based search may be awkward for people with coordination or vision handicaps.

Screen-based search may be supported by a specialized application such as where.com running on the handset, by an SMS short code, or by a WAP or XHTML-MP website page on a remote server displayed by the handset browser. Although most search tools today are based on handset software, the trend seems to be towards web-based services.

Also, when the consumer receives a reply to his search request, the most common way of delivery is via SMS.

Voice-based search is becoming viable due to advances in speech recognition technology. It is useful for people who have difficulty using the small keypad, or who need to get information while driving. Spoken prompts guide the users through the local directory to find an entry. The service may include fallback to a live operator if the speech technology has difficulty understanding what they are looking for, or a 'silent agent' may assist the speech recognition software.

Results may be spoken and/or delivered to the handset in SMS or MMS format, where they may be stored for future reference.

Most often, voice-based search uses the voice channel to deliver the caller's utterance to a server-based search application. In some cases, a small application on the mobile device undertakes the first part of speech recognition, breaking down the utterance into a series of elementary components or 'phones', and then sending the phones over the data channel to a server application.

Multimedia-based search will be prevalent as a hybrid form of both "voice-based" and "screen-based" search that will establish a time-memory tradeoff in the implementation process of fast-evolving mobile equipment.

== Types of information ==
Mobile search content may include more location-based and more street-smart information on businesses, products, services, events, human relations and other local specifics, which require immediacy and spontaneity. Besides, the location-based content may be formulated by accumulative data mining on consumer behaviors and whereabouts, which may trigger privacy concerns, commercial come-ons and, if necessary, some legislative justifications.

A search for businesses is the mobile equivalent of the printed Yellow Pages, but the search may focus on a small geographical area. For example, the caller may be looking for a nearby pharmacy or restaurant, or may want a local pizza delivery. The more advanced local search tools will vary the search radius depending on the type of business and the density of this type of business in the local area. For example, a caller looking for a coffee shop will probably want one within walking distance. If they are looking for a home furniture store they will expect to travel further. If they want a taxi, distance is not important: the taxi will come to them.

A search for products is more specific than a search for businesses. The user is looking for a particular product and wants to find a local business that stocks this product.

A full-function mobile local search service will go much further, particularly as smartphone penetration increases. For example, mobile users may want to find where a particular movie is playing, what restaurants are near the cinema, read reviews about those restaurants, and book reservations or buy movie tickets. They may want to hear about traffic conditions, the score from the local football game, the winning lottery number or where to go to vote.

== Differences from Web search ==
As opposed to Web search, mobile local search requires more immediacy and street-smart knowledge and information, local events and driving directions. The technical difference from web-based search is that, whether using the keypad or voice commands, the caller has limited 'bandwidth'. They do not want to hear or scroll through long lists of results. They want to "quickly and unobtrusively" zero in on the type of local information they are looking for, due to privacy, safety and time pressure.

Some of the advancements by the major portals in Internet search, such as Google's famous page-ranking scheme, do not apply in the wireless world since people are not searching for Web sites as much as answers to specific questions. 2006 showed a significant movement to the question-answer model. In this model answers are sent in reply to directory service queries similar to the nature of conventional 411 operators. AskMeNow, Ask.com and Bing.com all made efforts in this regard.

== Business models ==
Mobile local search services are typically provided today by mobile carriers, directory inquiry providers, mobile messaging operators or Yellow Pages publishers. Behind these outlets, there is an expanding network of agencies, distributors and software providers, some of whom are now starting to offer services directly to the public. Commonly used search engines such as Yahoo, Google, Bing, and big web publishers, such as Amazon.com and eBay have already embarked on this market segment.

The services are provided through a caller-pays, advertiser-pays or hybrid business model.

In a caller-pays model, as with voice-based directory enquiry services, the caller pays each time they access the service. Caller-pays voice-based local mobile search services are common outside North America, but have been slow to emerge in the USA due to regulatory restrictions.

In an advertiser-pays model, standard for screen-based search and starting to emerge with voice-based 'Free DA' services in North America, businesses pay to be placed early in the list of results, or pay each time a caller chooses to connect through.

In hybrid models, advertising revenue lets the service provider offer reduced rates.

As with TV, magazines and other media, mobile local search services will most likely continue to be offered under all three models, but the hybrid model may predominate. That is, callers will probably accept a limited amount of advertising (which they may actually find useful) in exchange for reduced prices, but may be less willing to use a free service where they are bombarded with advertising.

The value to an advertiser will vary depending on their type of business, and may range from a dollar or less for a taxi or sandwich shop to well over ten dollars for a real-estate broker, attorney or debt consolidation service. Consultants forecast that the global industry will grow to over US$1 billion by 2010.

== Service providers ==
Mobile local (MoLo) services are provided by numerous telecommunications carriers, including Verizon Wireless, AT&T, Vodafone, T-Mobile, Sprint Nextel, Orange SA.

Many Directory Assistance providers also offer mobile local search, including free DA providers Jingle Networks and 1-800-San-Diego in the US, 118 118, Yell Group, Pages Jaunes, Seat Pagine Gialle, Eniro etc. in Europe, and many others. One of the more fully functional services is provided by Contact Center Americas in Colombia.

The Yellow Pages Group in Canada provides one of the first voice-enabled local search services.

== See also ==
- Dashtop mobile
- Local search (Internet)
- Mobile platform
