= AroundMe =

Mobile application to find nearby points of interest

- Developer: Tweakersoft
- Initial release: September 2008
- Operating system: iOS, Android, Windows Phone
- Available in: 10 languages
- List of languages: English; French; Spanish; German; Portuguese; Swedish; Japanese; Italian; Russian; Dutch
- Type: Local search (Internet)
- License: Freeware
- Website: www.aroundmeapp.com

AroundMe is a mobile application for iOS, Android and Windows Phone platforms that allows users to quickly find nearby points of interest (POI) such as restaurants, hotels, theaters, parking, hospitals and much more.

AroundMe was the first mobile application for the iPhone to use the Google's location-aware API and also was the first mobile application to make use of Google dynamic mobile advertisement. As of March 2009, over 5 million copies of AroundMe have been downloaded and installed.

== Description ==
AroundMe uses the built-in smartphone navigation capabilities to perform location-aware searches.

A "Favorites" section allows the user save specific entries while the category "nearby" is used to identify nearby cities, parks, geographical locations, airports and attractions which are linked to appropriate Wikipedia entries.

== Reception ==
- Time's Top 10 iPhone Apps (2008)
- Time's 50 Best iPhone Apps (2011)
