= Location-based service =

Software services that use location data

A location-based service (LBS) is a software service which uses geographic data and information to search systems, in turn providing services or information to users. LBS can be used in a variety of contexts, such as health, indoor object search, entertainment, work, personal life, etc. Commonly used examples of location-based services include navigation software, social networking services, location-based advertising, and a tracking system. LBS can also include mobile commerce when taking the form of coupons or advertising directed at customers based on their current location. LBS also includes personalized weather services and even location-based games.

LBS is critical to many businesses as well as government organizations to drive real insight from data tied to a specific location where activities take place. With the user's geolocation patterns, a service can better understand user behavior and relationships. Banking, surveillance, online commerce, and many weapon systems are dependent on LBS.

Access policies are controlled by location data or time-of-day constraints, or a combination thereof. As such, an LBS is an information service and has a number of uses in social networking today as information in entertainment or security, which is accessible with mobile devices through the mobile network and which uses information on the geographical position of the mobile device.

This concept of location-based systems is not compliant with the standardized concept of real-time locating systems (RTLS) and related local services, as noted in ISO/IEC 19762-5 and ISO/IEC 24730-1. While networked computing devices generally do very well to inform consumers of days-old data, the computing devices themselves can also be tracked, even in real time. LBS privacy issues arise in that context and are documented below.

== History ==
Location-based services (LBSs) are widely used in many computer systems and applications. Modern location-based services are made possible by technological developments such as the World Wide Web, satellite navigation systems, and the widespread use of mobile phones.

Location-based services were developed by integrating data from satellite navigation systems, cellular networks, and mobile computing to provide services based on users' geographical locations. Over their history, location-based software has evolved from simple synchronization-based service models to authenticated and complex tools for implementing virtually any location-based service model or facility.

There is currently no agreed-upon criteria for defining the market size of location-based services, but the European GNSS Agency estimated that 40% of all computer applications used location-based software as of 2013, and 30% of all Internet searches were for locations.

LBS is the ability to open and close specific data objects based on the use of location or time (or both) as controls and triggers or as part of complex cryptographic key or hashing systems and the data they provide access to. Location-based services may be one of the most heavily used application-layer decision framework in computing.

The Global Positioning System was first developed by the United States Department of Defense in the 1970s and was made available for worldwide use by civilians in the 1980s. Research forerunners of today's location-based services include the infrared Active Badge system (1989–1993), the Ericsson-Europolitan GSM LBS trial by Jörgen Johansson (1995), and the master thesis written by Nokia employee Timo Rantalainen in 1995.

In 1990 International Teletrac Systems (later PacTel Teletrac), founded in Los Angeles CA, introduced the world's first dynamic real-time stolen vehicle recovery services. As an adjunct to this they began developing location-based services that could transmit information about location-based goods and services to custom-programmed alphanumeric Motorola pagers. In 1996 the US Federal Communications Commission (FCC) issued rules requiring all US mobile operators to locate emergency callers. This rule was a compromise resulting from US mobile operators seeking the support of the emergency community in order to obtain the same protection from lawsuits relating to emergency calls as fixed-line operators already had.

In 1997 Christopher Kingdon, of Ericsson, handed in the Location Services (LCS) stage 1 description to the joint GSM group of the European Telecommunications Standards Institute (ETSI) and the American National Standards Institute (ANSI). As a result, the LCS sub-working group was created under ANSI T1P1.5. This group went on to select positioning methods and standardize Location Services (LCS), later known as Location Based Services (LBS). Nodes defined include the Gateway Mobile Location Centre (GMLC), the Serving Mobile Location Centre (SMLC) and concepts such as Mobile Originating Location Request (MO-LR), Network Induced Location Request (NI-LR) and Mobile Terminating Location Request (MT-LR).

As a result of these efforts in 1999 the first digital location-based service patent was filed in the US and ultimately issued after nine office actions in March 2002. The patent has controls which when applied to today's networking models provide key value in all systems.

In 2000, after approval from the world's twelve largest telecom operators, Ericsson, Motorola and Nokia jointly formed and launched the Location Interoperability Forum Ltd (LIF). This forum first specified the Mobile Location Protocol (MLP), an interface between the telecom network and an LBS application running on a server in the Internet domain. Then, largely driven by the Vodafone group, LIF went on to specify the Location Enabling Server (LES), a "middleware", which simplifies the integration of multiple LBS with an operator's infrastructure. In 2004 LIF was merged with the Open Mobile Association (OMA). An LBS work group was formed within the OMA.

In 2002, Marex.com in Miami Florida designed the world's first marine asset telemetry device for commercial sale. The device, designed by Marex and engineered by its partner firms in telecom and hardware, was capable of transmitting location data and retrieving location-based service data via both cellular and satellite-based communications channels. Utilizing the Orbcomm satellite network, the device had multi-level SOS features for both MAYDAY and marine assistance, vessel system condition and performance monitoring with remote notification, and a dedicated hardware device similar to a GPS tracking unit. Based upon the device location, it was capable of providing detailed bearing, distance and communication information to the vessel operator in real time, in addition to the marine assistance and MAYDAY features. The concept and functionality were coined Location Based Services by the principal architect and product manager for Marex, Jason Manowitz, SVP, Product and Strategy. The device was branded as Integrated Marine Asset Management System (IMAMS), and the proof-of-concept beta device was demonstrated to various US government agencies for vessel identification, tracking, and enforcement operations in addition to the commercial product line. The device was capable of tracking assets including ships, planes, shipping containers, or any other mobile asset with a proper power source and antenna placement. Marex's financial challenges were unable to support product introduction and the beta device disappeared.

The first consumer LBS-capable mobile Web device was the Palm VII, released in 1999. Two of the in-the-box applications made use of the ZIP-code–level positioning information and share the title for the first consumer LBS application: the Weather.com app from The Weather Channel, and the TrafficTouch app from Sony-Etak / Metro Traffic.

The first LBS services were launched during 2001 by TeliaSonera in Sweden (FriendFinder, yellow pages, houseposition, emergency call location etc.) and EMT in Estonia (emergency call location, friend finder, TV game). TeliaSonera and EMT based their services on the Ericsson Mobile Positioning System (MPS).

Other early LBSs include Friendzone, launched by Swisscom in Switzerland in May 2001, using the technology of Valis Ltd. The service included friend finder, LBS dating and LBS games. The same service was launched later by Vodafone Germany, Orange Portugal and Pelephone in Israel. Microsoft's Wi-Fi-based indoor location system RADAR (2000), MIT's Cricket project using ultrasound location (2000) and Intel's Place Lab with wide-area location (2003).

In May 2002, go2 and AT&T Mobility launched the first (US) mobile LBS local search application that used Automatic Location Identification (ALI) technologies mandated by the FCC. go2 users were able to use AT&T's ALI to determine their location and search near that location to obtain a list of requested locations (stores, restaurants, etc.) ranked by proximity to the ALI provided by the AT&T wireless network. The ALI-determined location was also used as a starting point for turn-by-turn directions.

The main advantage is that mobile users do not have to manually specify postal codes or other location identifiers to use LBS when they roam into a different location.

== Location industry ==
Various companies sell access to an individual's location history and this is estimated to be a $12 billion industry composed of collectors, aggregators and marketplaces. As of 2021, a company named Near claimed to have data from 1.6 billion people in 44 different countries, Mobilewalla claims data on 1.9 billion devices, and X-Mode claims to have a database of 25 percent of the U.S. adult population. An analysis by the non-profit newsroom The Markup found six out of 47 companies claimed over a billion devices in their database. As of 2021, there are no rules or laws governing who can buy an individual's data.

== Applications ==
Location-based services are used in a wide range of applications, spanning consumer, commercial, and public safety sectors.

=== Navigation and information services ===
The most common application of LBS is in navigation and local search.

- Navigation: LBS provides turn-by-turn navigation in applications like Google Maps and Waze. It is also the basis for a journey planner that can calculate routes for driving, walking, or public transport, often as part of a larger intelligent design transportation system.
- Local search: Services use a device's location to provide information about nearby points of interest, such as restaurants, gas stations, or ATMs.

=== Commercial and enterprise ===
LBS is used in telematics, fleet digitalization, and modern logistics.

- Fleet management: LBS enables fleet telematics systems, providing automatic vehicle location (AVL). A telematic control unit (often a GPS tracking unit) uses LBS to continuously transmit its vehicle location data and other telemetry, allowing for real-time monitoring of vehicles and assets and enabling features like driver scoring.
- Track and trace: In logistics, LBS is used to track the location of individual packages and shipments throughout the supply chain.
- Location-based advertising and messaging: Retailers and marketers use LBS to send targeted promotions via mobile messaging, especially SMS, to potential customers who are in close proximity to their business. A classic example is the delivery of mobile coupons or discounts to subscribers near a specific store or restaurant.

=== Social networking ===
Many social media platforms have integrated LBS to enable geosocial networking features. These allow users to "check in" at locations, share their location with friends, or discover events happening nearby.

=== Safety and emergency services ===
- Emergency calls: LBS is used for emergency services like E911, where it automatically provides the caller's location to dispatchers, enabling a faster response.
- Stolen asset recovery: LBS is used in tracking systems to locate and recover stolen assets, from vehicles to high-value equipment.
- Personal safety: Many apps use LBS to allow users to share their live location with trusted contacts for safety purposes.

=== Entertainment ===
LBS is a component of location-based games, where a player's real-world location is a part of the gameplay. A prominent example of this is Pokémon Go.

== Locating methods ==
There are a number of ways in which the location of an object, such as a mobile phone or device, can be determined. Another emerging method for confirming location is IoT and blockchain-based relative object location verification.

=== Control plane locating ===
With control plane locating, sometimes referred to as positioning, the mobile phone service provider gets the location based on the radio signal delay of the closest cell-phone towers (for phones without satellite navigation features) which can be quite slow as it uses the 'voice control' channel. In the UK, networks do not use trilateration because LBS services use a single base station with a "radius" of inaccuracy to determine a phone's location. This technique was the basis of the E-911 mandate and is still used to locate cellphones as a safety measure. Newer phones and PDAs typically have an integrated A-GPS chip.

In addition there are emerging techniques like Real Time Kinematics and WiFi RTT (Round Trip Timing) as part of Precision Time Management services in WiFi and related protocols.

To provide a successful LBS technology the following factors must be met:

- coordinate accuracy requirements that are determined by the relevant service,
- lowest possible cost,
- minimal impact on network and equipment.

Several categories of methods can be used to find the location of the subscriber. The simple and standard solution is LBS based on a satellite navigation system such as Galileo or GPS. Sony Ericsson's "NearMe" is one such example; it is used to maintain knowledge of the exact location. Satellite navigation is based on the concept of trilateration, a basic geometric principle that allows finding one location if one knows its distance from other, already known locations.

=== Self-reported positioning ===
A low-cost alternative to using location technology to track the player is not tracking at all. This has been referred to as "self-reported positioning". It was used in the mixed reality game called Uncle Roy All Around You in 2003 and considered for use in the Augmented reality games in 2006. Instead of tracking technologies, players were given a map which they could pan around and subsequently mark their location upon. With the rise of location-based networking, this is more commonly known as a user "check-in".

=== Other ===
Near LBS (NLBS) involves local-range technologies such as Bluetooth Low Energy, wireless LAN, infrared or near-field communication technologies, which are used to match devices to nearby services. This application allows a person to access information based on their surroundings; especially suitable for using inside closed premises, restricted or regional area. Another alternative is an operator- and satellite-independent location service based on access to the deep-level telecoms network (SS7). This solution enables accurate and quick determination of the geographical coordinates of mobile phones by providing operator-independent location data and also works for handsets that do not have satellite navigation capability.

In addition, the IP address could provide the end-user's location.

Many other local positioning systems and indoor positioning systems are available, especially for indoor use. GPS and GSM do not work very well indoors, so other techniques are used, including co-pilot beacon for CDMA networks, Bluetooth, UWB, RFID and Wi-Fi.

== Privacy issues ==
The Location Privacy Protection Act of 2012 (S.1223) was introduced by Senator Al Franken (D-MN) in order to regulate the transmission and sharing of user location data in the United States. It is based on the individual's one-time consent to participate in these services (Opt In). The bill specifies the collecting entities, the collectable data and its usage. The bill does not specify, however, the period of time that the data collecting entity can hold on to the user data (a limit of 24 hours seems appropriate since most of the services use the data for immediate searches, communications, etc.), and the bill does not include location data stored locally on the device (the user should be able to delete the contents of the location data document periodically just as he would delete a log document). The bill, approved by the Senate Judiciary Committee, would also require mobile services to disclose the names of the advertising networks or other third parties with which they share consumers' locations.

With the passing of the CAN-SPAM Act in 2003, it became illegal in the United States to send any message to the end user without the end user specifically opting in. This put an additional challenge on LBS applications as far as "carrier-centric" services were concerned. As a result, there has been a focus on user-centric location-based services and applications which give the user control of the experience, typically by opting in first via a website or mobile interface (such as SMS, mobile Web, and Java/BREW applications).

The European Union also provides a legal framework for data protection that may be applied to location-based services, and more particularly several European directives such as: (1) Personal data: Directive 95/46/EC; (2) Personal data in electronic communications: Directive 2002/58/EC; (3) Data Retention: Directive 2006/24/EC. However the applicability of legal provisions to varying forms of LBS and of processing location data is unclear.

One implication of this technology is that data about a subscriber's location and historical movements is owned and controlled by the network operators, including mobile carriers and mobile content providers. Mobile content providers and app developers are a concern. Indeed, a 2013 MIT study by de Montjoye et al. showed that 4 spatio-temporal points, approximate places and times, are enough to uniquely identify 95% of 1.5M people in a mobility database. The study further shows that these constraints hold even when the resolution of the dataset is low. Therefore, even coarse or blurred datasets provide little anonymity. A critical article by Dobson and Fisher discusses the possibilities for misuse of location information.

Besides the legal framework there exist several technical approaches to protect privacy using privacy-enhancing technologies (PETs). Such PETs range from simplistic on/off switches to sophisticated PETs using anonymization techniques (e.g. providing k-anonymity), or cryptographic protocols. Only a few LBS offer such PETs; e.g., Google Latitude offered an on/off switch and allows one to stick one's position to a freely definable location. Additionally, it is an open question how users perceive and trust different PETs. The only study that addresses user perception of state-of-the-art PETs is. Another set of techniques included in the PETs are the location obfuscation techniques, which slightly alter the location of the users in order to hide their real location while still being able to represent their position and receive services from their LBS provider.

Recent research has shown that crowdsourcing is also an effective approach to locating lost objects while still upholding users' privacy. This is done by ensuring a limited level of interaction between users.

== See also ==
- Advanced Mobile Location
- Cartography
- Dashtop mobile
- Dead reckoning
- Enterprise digital assistant
- Fire Eagle
- Geo (marketing)
- Geoloqi
- Geosocial networking
- Groundhog Technologies
- Key finder
- Indoor positioning system
- LocationSmart
- Location awareness
- Location intelligence
- Location-based games
- Location-based media
- Mobile dating
- Mobile identity management
- Mobile local search
- Mobile positioning
- Navizon
- Near-me area network
- Real-time locating
- Reverse geocoding
- Social positioning method
- Urban informatics
- Wayfinding
- Wi-Fi positioning system
