= Groundhog Technologies =

American private company

Groundhog Technologies, Inc.
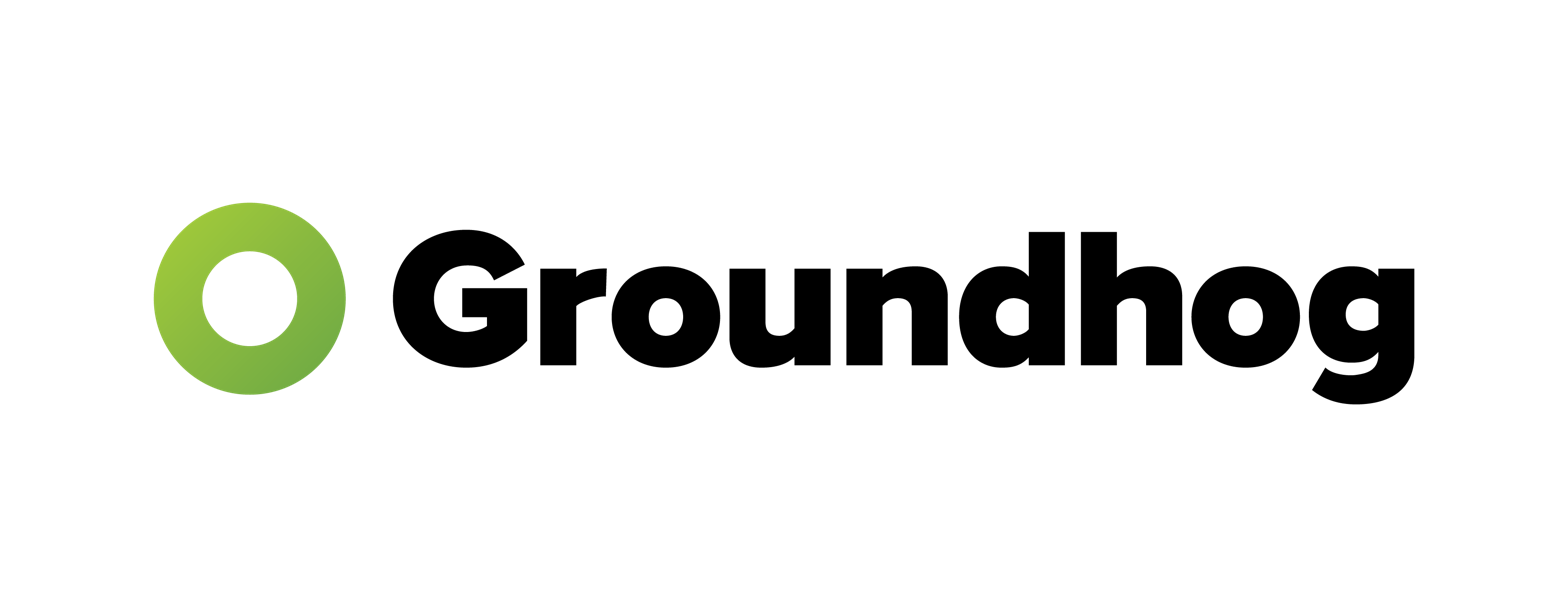
- Company type: Private
- Industry: Telecommunication
- Founded: 2001
- Founder: David Chiou
- Headquarters: Cambridge, Massachusetts, U.S.
- Services: Geolocation, mobility intelligence, network optimization, data monetization
- Website: https://www.ghtinc.com

Groundhog Technologies is a privately held company founded in 2001 and is headquartered in Cambridge, Massachusetts, United States. As a spin-off of MIT Media Lab, it was a semi-finalist in MIT's $50,000 Entrepreneurship Competition in 2000 and was incorporated the following year. The company received the first round of financing from major Japanese corporations and their venture capital arms in November 2002: Marubeni, Yasuda Enterprise Development and Japan Asia Investment Co. It received second round of financing in 2004 and since then has become self-sustainable. Groundhog Inc., Groundhog Technologies Inc.'s operation center in Taiwan, went public in 2022

The company's products are built on top of its Mobility Intelligence Platform, which analyzes the locations, quality of experience, context, and lifestyles of subscribers in mobile operator's network. The intelligence about geolocation is then applied to improve subscribers’ experience and enable applications such as geomarketing and geotargeting. The company has leveraged its platform to enable operators to address the advertising and data monetization opportunity both internally and in partnership with third party retailers, advertisers, and ad networks.

== Core technologies ==
Groundhog Technologies launched its Mobility Intelligence platform based on chaos theory and multi-dimensional modeling. The application of chaos theory gave rise to the company's mathematical models of subscribers' mobility and usage behavior, which can be used for different applications such as by mobile operators to optimize networks according to the user demands.

Human moving pattern in phase space

According to chaos theory, some seemly random or chaotic signals may be converted to analyze in phase space which can reveal the patterns behind it. The cases of most interest arise when the chaotic behavior shows patterns around an attractor in the phase space. Based on the attractor in the phase space, data can be used from different space, time, and individuals for modeling and indoor geolocation.

It is also found that the dimensional structure and characteristics of phase space can naturally neutralize the bias of positioning (based on techniques such as triangulation or trilateration) caused by reasons such as multipath. That is, although each input is biased in some way, the observation from different dimensions and angles are biased in different ways. Combining multi-dimensional input in the phase space, based on the law of large numbers it can average out the bias with different samples through dimensions, time, and individuals.

== See also ==
- Location-based services
- Geolocation software
