= CalAmp =

American software company

CalAmp Corporation
- Type: Private
- Traded as: Nasdaq: CAMP (1983-2024)
- Industry: Telematics; SaaS; IoT
- Founded: 1981; 45 years ago
- Headquarters: Irvine, California, U.S.
- Key people: Chris Adams (CEO)
- Products: CalAmp Telematics Cloud; iOn Telematics Services; CrashBoxx; iOn Tags, iOn Vision; LoJack; LoJack SureDrive; LoJack LotSmart; Telematics Devices; Here Comes The Bus; Bus Guardian
- Revenue: ▲US$ 366.1 million (2020); ▲US$ 363.8 million (2019)
- Number of employees: 1,080 (May 2020)
- Website: calamp.com

CalAmp Corporation is an Irvine, California-based provider of Internet of things (IoT) software applications, cloud services, data intelligence and 'telematics products and services. The company's technology includes edge computing devices and SaaS-based applications for remotely tracking and managing vehicles, drivers, cargo, and other mobile assets as part of a fleet telematics system. The company also owns the patents and trademarks for the LoJack Stolen Vehicle Recovery System and provides connected car and lot management products.

== History ==
CalAmp was founded as California Amplifier Inc. in Newbury Park, California, in 1981, by Jacob Inbar and David Nichols, who worked together at a microwave division of Eaton Corporation. The company originally made amplifiers and other equipment used to transmit microwave signals for satellite video and broadband communications. The company began trading on NASDAQ in 1983.

By 1986, the company had relocated to Camarillo, California, and stopped making amplifiers for the consumer market.

In 1999, the company entered the direct broadcast satellite (DBS) market by acquiring Texas-based Gardiner Group, a satellite dish-component provider.

In December 2003, the company acquired communications software company Vytek Corp, for $76.8 million.

In March 2004, the company relocated to Oxnard, California. In August, the company changed its name to CalAmp Corp.

In May 2006, the company acquired Montreal, Canada-based wireless radio company Dataradio, to expand its wireless data communications business for public safety and machine to machine applications. It also acquired the mobile resource management line from Carlsbad, California-based location tracking company TechnoCom to offer enterprise asset tracking systems' and fleet management applications.

In 2007, the company acquired the Aercept Vehicle Tracking business from wireless telematics service provider AirIQ, expanding its automatic vehicle location capabilities.

By 2010, the company was focused on selling IoT hardware, including the telematic control unit and DBS solutions.

In December 2012, the company announced the acquisition of Herndon, Virginia-based fleet management application provider Wireless Matrix Corp for $53 million.

In February 2013, the company announced a stock offering that was intended in part to fund the Wireless Matrix Corp purchase.

In April 2015, CalAmp bought telematics startup Crashboxx, a provider of a risk management vehicle tracking system for insurance companies and fleet operators.

By 2016, the company had phased out its DBS business and shifted its focus to SaaS-based telematics products and services. In February, CalAmp announced it was acquiring stolen vehicle recovery company LoJack Corporation for $134 million, and the deal closed in March. In April, the company announced it was moving its headquarters from Oxnard to Irvine, California. In September, the company introduced the LoJack LotSmart automotive dealer inventory management solution and LoJack SureDrive connected car application.

In March 2016, CalAmp acquired the LoJack company for $134 million.

In January 2019, the company launched a smartwatch-sized pet-tracking device called Maven, in conjunction with logistics software company CargoSense. In March 2019, the company acquired two LoJack licensees, Car Track in Mexico, and Tracker in the United Kingdom. In April, the company acquired fellow telematics provider Synovia Solutions for $50 million, a company known for its applications in public transport and school-bus tracking. In March 2020, CEO Michael Burdiek retired and was replaced by Jeff Gardner.

In 2024, CalAmp filed for Chapter 11 bankruptcy, allowing for a secured deal with its lenders to swap its $229 million in bonds for equity. The company stated that its financial state has been bleak for many years, blaming its acquisition of LoJack and an ill-fated program that stretches customer's payment terms. After CalAmp restructured, it was taken private by a company called Lynrock Lake LP.
