= Eixos =

Catalan for-profit, cartographical urban economy project

Eixos (eixos.cat)
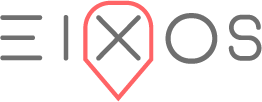
- Commercial?: Yes
- Type of project: Online observatory on geomarketing and business mapping
- Owner: Service offered by the limited company Planol.info (Nolpla Nolpla S.L.)
- Founder: David Nogué i Espinilla
- Launched: 2011; Barcelona
- Website: www.eixos.cat

EIXOS or eixos.cat (Eastern Catalan: [ˈe.ʃus], "axis") is a Catalan for-profit, cartographical urban economy project. It accounts as the core service of Planol.info, an online mapping company founded in 2011 in Barcelona (Catalonia, Spain) by David Nogué i Espinilla. The business is registered as the limited company Nolpla Nolpa SL, with headquarters in Barcelona and Arcata, California.

The service runs as a consulting observatory. It was a pioneer in providing solutions for online geomarketing and business mapping by crossing own databases with open, public repositories under Creative Commons licenses. During its launching year, Planol.info was awarded with a grant from Fundació puntCat to incubate EIXOS. In 2012, it received one of the Galileo Awards from the European Space Agency (ESA) and also one of the Laus Prizes (Premis Laus) by Foment de les Arts i el Disseny (FAD) as the second-best web product design.

== Data processing and business operations ==
EIXOS serves as an observatory for the economic activity of cities and industrial parks around the world. It develops market research and strategic commercial planning, both for public administration and for private development.

It is considered one of the most relevant consulting projects on mapping in the so-called Catalan countries and in Spain. Throughout EIXOS, Planol.info delivers Creative Commons licensed information. Its datasets derive from a combination of staffed and voluntary fieldwork over a specific commercial or geographical network, which is then crossed with multiple public information repositories: demography, land use (urban qualification), and many additional economical metrics. Finally, the company applies predictive analytic layers to the refined datasets. In Catalonia EIXOS is registered as one of the main governmental Web Service providers of the Catalan Space Data Infrastructure.

Shortly after being founded the project initially served several Catalan municipalities such as Barcelona, Girona, Mollet del Vallès, or Tarragona. Those reports were subsequently used for economical urban planning. Furthermore, some results and conclusions were also applied into academic and university output on business density, commercial enhancement, employment policies, and crisis prevention. By 2013, EIXOS' commercial basic layers had already mapped the whole area of Catalonia.

In the mid-2010s Planol.info also implemented EIXOS' geomarketing services and open-access public databases in other Spanish cities such as Madrid and Seville. In a partnership with the European Space Agency, it covered a set of European cities such as Florence (Italy) and Paris (France) as well. Additionally, the Dutch company Layar published several layers of textile, catering, floral, and ironmongery retailers for their smartphone-oriented products. Google Business View and Here Technologies (the mapping branch of Mercedes-Benz) became highlighted customers of Planol.info's services.

Amidst the COVID-19 pandemic, EIXOS expanded its range of commercial solutions towards predictive data analysis on the impact of lockdowns in the urban commercial distribution and resilience. The observatory developed customized algorithms and intervention maps in close collaboration with the Massachusetts Institute of Technology (MIT) for cities such as Manhattan (US), London (UK), São Paulo (Brazil), and again Barcelona. In the latter, moreover, those predictions were adapted to predict the impact of new street reclamation (in Catalan, superilles), and to better define the quality decrease of tourism-oriented shops.
