= Indiacom =

Indian company

- Indiacom.com homepage as of 13 April 2013
- Company type: Yellow Pages and Data Services
- Website type: Local
- Available in: Multilingual
- Founded: 21 January 1988; 38 years ago
- Headquarters: Pune, Maharashtra, India
- Website: www.indiacom.com
- Advertising: Online & offline,
- Launched: 19 April 2003; 23 years ago

Indiacom (formerly known as Sesa Seat) is an Indian company, engaged in the business of providing local search business data. Indiacom is the brand of Indiacom Limited. It is headquartered in Pune, Maharashtra.

== Origin ==
Indiacom was founded in technical and financial collaboration between Sesa Goa Limited and STET S.p.a. of Italy (a Division of IRI) on 21 January 1988. The initial vision of the company was to add a wider dimension to the information industry in India.

== Organisation ==
The company has a presence in Maharashtra, Gujarat, and Andhra Pradesh. Indiacom has offices in Pune, Hyderabad, Vadodara, Jaipur and Noida. Indiacom operates through its associates in six other cities: Bangalore, Chennai, Mumbai, Ahmedabad, Surat, Kolkata and Goa. Members of the core team of Indiacom have been with the company almost since its inception and have witnessed the transition from the traditional print centric media to digital media.

== Yellow Pages and data services ==
Indiacom has gained a good track record for millions of yellow pages telephone directories. It has published for various districts of India on behalf of the union-owned company BSNL. Indiacom continues to publish its own annual business telephone directory yellow pages. The company has now transitioned to various data centric services business lines, by providing business data to search engine multinational companies, navigational companies, and developers.

== Web presence ==
=== Indiacom.com ===
Indiacom.com was launched in the year 2003. The website has information on businesses across various cities of India. The website receives more than 500,000 unique visits per month.

=== HelloGoa.com ===
Indiacom launched the website www.hellogoa.com in 2005, providing business information regarding hotels, health care, travel, restaurants, and entertainment for Goa.

== Mobile applications ==
=== Indiacom's first Android application: "Hello Goa" ===
The Android application "Hello Goa" was launched by the company in 2013. In addition to providing business information for Goa, the app enables a user to obtain directions to a place of business with mapping and navigation features. Businessmen can also add their listings into the Indiacom database through this application.
