= 118 118 =

118 118 is a telephone number used by two major directory enquiries providers:

- 118 118 (UK), owned by The Number UK Ltd
- 118 118 (Sweden), owned by Eniro AB
