= Eleni Stroulia =

Greek/Canadian computer scientist

Eleni Stroulia is a Greek and Canadian computer scientist whose research concerns artificial intelligence, social computing, smart buildings, the internet of things, and software engineering for real-world applications. She is a professor of computing science at the University of Alberta, where she has been a McCalla Professor and the holder of the NSERC/AITF Industrial Research Chair in Service Systems Management.

== Education and career ==
Stroulia was born in Larissa, and graduated from the University of Patras in 1989. She completed her Ph.D. at the Georgia Institute of Technology in 1994. At the University of Alberta, she helped found Ada's Team, a support group for women and people from other disadvantaged groups among computing students. She held the NSERC/AITF Industrial Research Chair in Service Systems Management from 2010 to 2016. She was named one of nine McCalla Professors for 2018–2019.

== Research ==
Her research has included work on algorithms recognizing depression from recordings of people's voices, and the use of virtual reality to assist older people with in-home exercise. She is also associated with the Far-Play project for augmented reality research at the University of Alberta.
