= Local advertising =

Local advertising is used in geomarketing to optimize ad delivery.<ref...> This platform is applied to customers depending on their location. Making purchasing or service decisions is influenced by local marketing. Marketers and businesses consider local advertising necessary for economic growth. Advertising is usually funded by a sponsor who promotes the advertisement through different types of media, for example, television, newspaper, commercial radio advertisement, magazine mail, etc. Television is one of the most expensive forms of advertisements and also is shown to most people. The expansion of manufactured goods in the 20th century has led to the increase of local advertising. If an advertisement of a product is seen, a consumer is more likely to buy the product. Advertisements are arranged and displayed in a certain way, so consumers are attracted. Using endorsements such as celebrity appearance, increases the buyer potential of the consumer. Celebrities are usually involved in all advertisements now. Advertisements with celebrities can also have downsides depending on what the celebrity has done. Research shows if the consumer has similarities or is the same gender, the chance of the consumer buying the good increases. At the start of the 21st century, social media and mobile advertisements began to be focused by small and large companies. There is a bigger chance the consumer will think about purchasing the product, if it is presented to the consumer right away.

Advertising's main purpose is to make the consumer ponder about the advertisement. Memories have a substantial part, on if the consumer is deciding to buy the product. Memories, for a certain type of advertisement, are when the consumer has had some previous relationship with the product. Advertisements focus on the consumer mindset to attract the most consumers. A convincing advertisement will most likely attract more consumers, rather than an advertisement which is dull or boring. Online advertisements, at the start of the internet, have a greater audience and chance to attract more consumers. Online advertisements are able to give consumers every bit of information right away, unlike traditional advertisements. The majority of local advertisers have some sort of local existence and the majority is through online. In most cases consumers will not buy the product as soon as their introduced but might think about it later. Consumer may have seen your business somewhere, but usually don't know what the business really offers, this is when local advertisements are a good idea to advertise on what the business offers.

== See also ==
- Geo (marketing)
- Local search (Internet)
- Positioning (telecommunications)
- Online advertising
