= Far-Play =

Software platform

fAR-Play
- Developer: fAR-Play Team
- Initial release: 2008
- Written in: php
- Platform: iOS, Android
- Type: ARG
- Website: farplay.ualberta.ca

Far-Play (stylized fAR-Play, from augmented reality) was a software platform developed at the University of Alberta, for creating location-based, scavenger-hunt style games which use the GPS and web-connectivity features of a player's smartphone. According to the development team, "our long-term objective is to develop a general framework that supports the implementation of AARGs that are fun to play and also educational". It utilizes Layar, an augmented reality smartphone application, QR codes located at particular real-world sites, or a phone's web browser, to facilitate games which require players to be in close physical proximity to predefined "nodes". A node, referred to by the developers as a Virtual Point of Interest (vPOI), is a point in space defined by a set of map coordinates; fAR-Play uses the GPS function of a player's smartphone — or, for indoor games, which are not easily tracked by GPS satellites, specially-created QR codes— to confirm that they are adequately near a given node. Once a player is within a node's proximity, Layar's various augmented reality features can be utilized to display a range of extra content overlaid upon the physical play-space or launch another application for extra functionality.

== Development and features ==
fAR-Play began development in 2008, emerging from a collaborative project undertaken by a group of University of Alberta students from the Computer Science and Humanities Computing departments. fAR-Play is still under development, but a beta version is available for testing by request. fAR-Play's development is managed by a team of interdisciplinary professors and students at the University of Alberta. Currently, the developing team's roster includes Supervising Professors Geoffrey Rockwell and Eleni Stroulia, Developers Lucio Gutierrez and Matthew Delaney, and Website Developers Calen Henry and Garry Wong.

=== Technology ===
fAR-Play relies on a number of open- and closed-source web technologies as tools to create, and enhance the users' experience. Layar is the recommended client-side frontend for delivering game content to the player; it is available on Android and iOS, which covers over 91% of smartphones. While Layar is not a requirement to play fAR-Play games, the application does supply additional augmented reality functionality; Layar also includes a built-in QR scanner. Depending on the design of the particular game, the player may instead use a dedicated QR code scanner; the developers recommend BeeTagg, but any such application will do. Layar or a QR code scanner are the maximum software requirements to play a fAR-Play game, making implementation of games on a wide variety of platforms relatively straightforward. fAR-Play games can also be designed for play strictly within a mobile phone's web browser. On the server side, fAR-Play's engine is composed of an Apache server which manages the system's web interface, including the mobile and desktop versions of the fAR-Play website, and a Java-based REST framework for managing the database of nodes.

=== Features ===
As a platform for designing AR games, as opposed to an AR game itself, fAR-Play offers little in the way of explicit shapes or patterns for games to take; instead, these elements are left to the game designer or players to develop. However, the nonspecific nature of nodes, the many options they offer for content delivery, and the open design of the platform are such that these elements can be developed extensively. Functionally, fAR-Play is a tool for tracking arbitrary points in space and a given player's proximity to them; what it does beyond that is up to the developers' and players' discretion. However, the fAR-Play website contains a leaderboard which tracks registered user's total scores. Players are assigned levels based on their total score, ranging from Novice — Super Player. Player profiles will display nodes that the player has recently caught, and any achievements the player has gained. Additionally, players can share their adventure progress, achievements, and the capture of vPOIs on Facebook.

== How to play ==
In order to participate in the locative aspects of fAR-Play games, users must have an Android or iOS mobile device and access to wireless internet. Players can participate in fAR-Play anonymously, or create and sign into a fAR-Play account. Those who choose to play anonymously will lose the ability to track their progress across multiple games. When signed in, the player is presented with a list of games that are currently available for play. Each game includes a brief description and the various "adventures" available to the player. Once the game has been started, the player has three different methods for capturing nodes: they may scan a QR in the physical space, discover a node through the Layar camera virtual view, or receive a link in their device's web browser.

=== QR codes and Layar ===
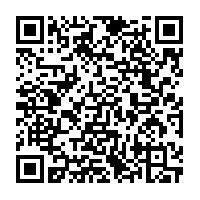
A QR code used in a fAR-Play game.

QR codes can only be used as a method for capturing nodes and initiating games when there is a physical code present. In order to scan a QR code, players are required to have an application which can capture and recognize QR codes. If the player is utilizing a QR scanning application that has a built in browser, they will be required to log into fAR-Play through the app. Layar is a free to download augmented reality app, containing a built in QR code scanner, which enables its users to participate in fAR-Play games.

=== Capturing nodes ===
Layar permits the player to see nodes on their mobile device, guiding the player to their goal. Using this application, the player is able to navigate to their objective with map provided by Google Maps' API or by using their camera — Layar overlays a virtual image onto the real-world scene presented by the camera. The representations on screen expand in size as the player approaches the node destination, simulating relative distance. If the player taps any of the nodes that are presented on the screen, they will be provided additional information about that node, including the node's name and a brief description. Nodes can be captured by tapping the "capture" button.

=== Playing on browsers ===
The player can also play fAR-Play games within their mobile device's browser. By visiting https://web.archive.org/web/20160808195825/http://farplay.ualberta.ca/far-play/ on a mobile device, players will be presented with a fully realized user interface, permitting full interaction with the games. The player can capture the in game vPOIs through their browser by tapping the "nodes" button. This will bring up a list of all the accessible nodes, complete with a brief description for each location. By clicking on one of the nodes, the player is shown to a screen with a mapped location of the vPOI, an in-depth description of it, and hints. At the top of the page, the player can tap "CAPTURE THIS NODE" and advance in the game. When attempting to capture a node, the developer may or may not associate a challenge with the node. For example, in the game "Zombies ate my Campus", when players are attempting to capture a node, they're presented with a multiple choice question associated with the current node.

=== Game types ===
Players complete an adventure when they have captured all of the nodes within it. fAR-Play provides two game modes: in a Virtual Scavenger Hunt, nodes must be captured in a specific order; in a Virtual Treasure Hunt, the order is unimportant.

== Existing fAR-Play games ==
Games currently available through fAR-Play include:

- Giselle Ever After
- Thought Hub
- Comics Arts Capture Challenge
- Pioneering Edmonton
- The Intelliphone Challenge
- A Tour of Atwater
- Zombies ate my Campus

== For developers ==
fAR-Play's ultimate goal is to provide a simple, effective platform for the creation of locative augmented reality games, but the developer tools are still under active development and not openly available to the public. Access can be granted on a case-by-case basis, however, and a developer's manual is available. Users with development privileges can create new games or edit their existing games, in addition to playing their own or others' games.

=== Adventures ===
Games that are developed with fAR-Play are segmented into components called "Adventures". To progress through each game adventure, the player must reach and capture virtual points of interest, referred to in the game as vPOIs. In order to capture a vPOI, the player must travel to a physical location that is set by the developer. It is the developer's choice to include a challenge question to capture the vPOI, though it is not mandatory. A deduction of points can be implemented if the player submits an incorrect answer to a challenge question.

=== Points and achievements ===
Each of the nodes will reward the player with a predetermined number of points once they have been captured by the player. These points are added to the player's total points. Each of the adventures that are created require a predetermined number of vPOIs to be completed before the player can advance. fAR-Play has the ability to implement achievements, which can reward players with extra points for completing certain tasks. The two general classifications of achievements in the game are: "Percentage of Adventure Completed" and "Percentage of Game Completed".

=== Win conditions ===
The developer must decide if the vPOIs must be completed in a certain order, or if the order is inconsequential. Additionally, the developer can choose if the win condition of an adventure requires all vPOIs to be captured, or only a certain percentage of them. Game creators can set a "Catch Limit" for each vPOI, which restricts the number of times each node may be captured. This can be used to encourage races and competitive play.

=== Name, description and customization ===
When developing a game for fAR-Play, the site requires that users submit a game name, game description, and game story. Each of the adventures within the game will also require a name, and type; Scavenger Hunt is currently the only available adventure type. For additional aesthetic customization, fAR-Play allows developers to utilize CSS to customize the appearance and layout of the player's interface.

=== Hints ===
The developer may implement a hint system within the game to guide players through the experience. These hints can take the form of an image, audio, or video file. To encourage the player to discover answers for themselves, the game can penalize players for the use of hints, reducing their points by a predetermined number.

== Notes ==
=== References ===
- Guiterrez, L., et al. "fAR-PLAY: a framework to develop augmented/alternate reality games." Second IEEE Workshop On Pervasive Collaboration and Social Networking. 2011.
- Llamas, Ramon, et al. "Android and iOS Combine for 91.1% of the Worldwide Smartphone OS Market in 4Q12 and 87.6% for the Year, According to IDC." International Data Corporation. idc.com, 14 February 2013. Accessed 15 November 2013.
- The fAR-Play Team. A Player's Guide to fAR-Play. farplay.ualberta.ca. ND. Accessed 15 November 2013.
- The fAR-Play Team. "fAR-Play Developers' Manual". farplay.ualberta.ca. 27 September 2011. Accessed 15 November 2013.
- The fAR-Play Team. fAR-Play.ualberta.ca. 2010. Accessed 15 November 2013.
