= Social positioning method =

The social positioning method (SPM) studies space-time behaviour by analysing the location coordinates of mobile phones and the social characteristics of the people carrying them. The SPM methods and experiments were developed in Estonia by Positium and Institute of Geography University of Tartu during 2003-2006.

The biggest advantage of mobile positioning-based methods is that mobile phones are widespread, positioning works inside buildings, and collection of movement data is done by a third party at regular intervals. Positioning data is digital; it is easy to trace many people at the same time and it is possible to analyse movements in real time. The disadvantage of mobile positioning today is relatively low preciseness, the boom in the generation of phones with a GPS will raise positioning accuracy.

The most important problems of SPM are related to data security, as well as concerns about non-authorized personal surveillance. These problems can be solved with further development of location-based services (LBS) and relevant legal and organisational regulation. Today mobile positioning can be applied only by obtaining participants’ personal acceptance.
