= Layar =

Dutch augmented reality company

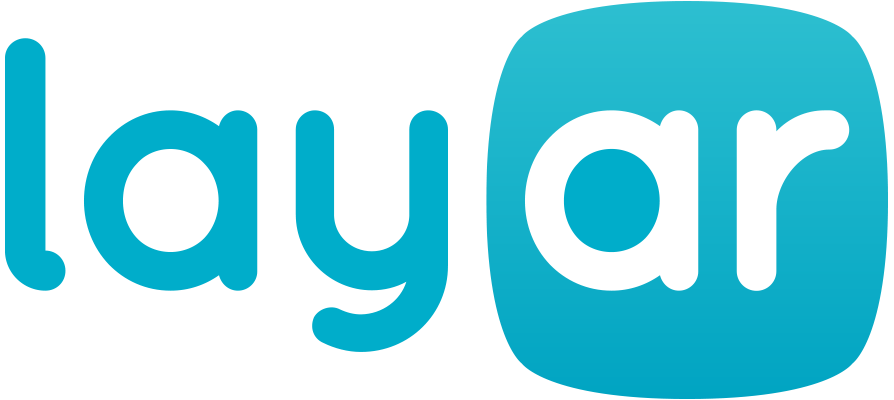
- Industry: Augmented reality
- Founded: Amsterdam, The Netherlands (June 2009)
- Founders: Maarten Lens-FitzGerald; Claire Boonstra; Raimo van der Klein
- Products: The Layar App; The Layar Creator; The Layar SDK; Layar Branded App Solutions; Layar Connect API
- Services: Augmented Reality; Interactive Print
- Number of employees: 25-50
- Parent: Blippar
- Website: www.layar.com

Layar was a Dutch company based in Amsterdam, founded in 2009 by Raimo van der Klein, Claire Boonstra and Maarten Lens-FitzGerald. They created a mobile browser app called Layar. The browser allowed users to find various items, using augmented reality technology.

On September 1, 2010, the World Economic Forum announced the company as a Technology Pioneer for 2011.

In June 2014, Layar was acquired by the UK company Blippar. The Layar office in Amsterdam was closed down in 2016.

In January 2019, it was reported that co-founders Klein and Lens-FitzGerald had expressed interest in buying back the intellectual property of Layar to relaunch it as an independent business.

== Technology ==
The browser makes use of the following:

- Accelerometer
- Built-in camera
- Compass
- GPS

These are used together to identify the user's location and field of view. From the geographical position, the various forms of data are laid over the camera view like inserting an additional layer.

== Content ==
Data in the browser comes in the form of layers. Layers are REST web services serving geo-located points of interest in the vicinity of the user. Layers were developed and maintained by third parties (such as the commercial one from EIXOS) using a free API; Layar as a company was responsible for their validation in the publication process. Third-party projects which utilize Layar can be programs which require QR tags, or locative games, such as fAR-Play.

As of July 2010, Layar had 1,000 layers. As of September 2011, Layar had 2,993 layers.
