= Location obfuscation =

Privacy technique in software

Location obfuscation is a technique used in location-based services or information systems to protect the location of the users by slightly altering, substituting or generalizing their location in order to avoid reflecting their real position.

A formal definition of location obfuscation can be "the means of deliberately degrading the quality of information about an individual's location in order to protect that individual's location privacy.

== Obfuscation techniques ==
The most common techniques to perform this change are:

- Pseudonyms and the use of third party location providers
- "Spatial cloaking" techniques in which a user is k-anonymous if her exact location cannot be distinguished among k-1 other users
- "Invisible cloaking", in which no locations are provided for certain zones
- Adding random noise to the position
- Rounding, which uses landmarks to approximate the location
- Redefinition of possible areas of location.

Each technique for obfuscating location has strengths and weaknesses, and it is important to assess them based on each use case. For example, adding random noise is simple to implement, but can inadvertently create a circle of obfuscated values where the center reveals the individual's exact location. One should also consider the level of obfuscation required in urban areas versus rural areas.
