= Near-me area network =

Type of short-scale computer network

A near-me area network is a logical grouping of communication devices that are in close physical proximity to each other, but not necessarily connected to the same communication network infrastructure. Thus, two smartphones connected via different mobile carriers may form a near-me area network.

Near-me area network applications focus on communications among devices within a certain proximity to each other, but don't generally concern themselves with the devices' exact locations.

== Background ==
The Internet consists of different types of communication networks. Common types include local area networks (LAN), metropolitan area networks (MAN), and wide area networks (WAN). Local area networks have the coverage of a small geographic area, such as a school, residence, building, or company. Metropolitan area networks cover a larger area, such as a city or state. Wide area networks provide communication in a broad geographic area covering national and international locations. Personal area networks (PANs) are wireless LANs with a very short range (up to a few meters), enabling computer devices (such as PDAs and printers) to communicate with other nearby devices and computers.

The concept of near-me area networks has become relevant based on the increasing popularity of location-sensitive mobile devices, including iPhone and Android smartphones, Some services are meaningful only to a group of people in close proximity.

== Examples ==
- Ben is going to the ABC supermarket to buy three bottles of red wine. The supermarket offers a 30 percent discount on the purchase of six bottles, so he sends a message to other customers to see if they would like to buy the other three bottles of wine.
- Susan bought a movie ticket 15 minutes ago, but she now feels dizzy and can't watch the film. She sends out messages to people around the cinema to see if anyone will purchase her ticket at 40 percent off.
- In a theme park, guests would like to know each ride's queue status to manage their waiting time. So, they take a photo of the queue they are in and share it with other guests through a network application.
- Ann works at Causeway Bay and would like to find someone to have lunch with. She checks her friend list to see who is closest to her at this moment and invites that friend to join her.
- Carol just lost her son in the street, so she sends out his picture, which is stored in her mobile device, to passers-by to see if they can find him.

== See also ==
- Location-based service
