= Geomarketing =

Use of geographic information in marketing activities

In marketing, geomarketing (also called marketing geography) is a discipline that uses geolocation (geographic information) in the process of planning and implementation of marketing activities. It can be used in any aspect of the marketing mix — the product, price, promotion, or place (geo targeting). Market segments can also correlate with location, and this can be useful in targeted marketing.

Geomarketing is applied in the financial sector by identifying ATMs traffic generators and creating hotspot maps based on geographical parameters integrated with customer behavior.

Geomarketing has a direct impact on the development of modern trade and the reorganization of retail types. Site selection becomes automated and based on scientific procedures that saves both time and money. Geomarketing uses key facts, a good base map, Whois data layers, consumer profiling, and success/fail criteria.

GPS tracking and GSM localization can be used to obtain the actual position of the travelling customer.

== Software ==
GIS software is used to display data that can be linked to a geographic region or area. It can be used to:

- Recommend nearby social events.
- Determine where the customers are (on country, city, street or user level).
- Determine who the customer is (on organisation or user level), or make a guess on it based on earlier encounters by tracking IP address, credit card information, VOIP address, etc.
- Visualize any data in a geographic context by linking it to a digital map.
- Locate a web client's computer on a digital map.
- Calculate summary information for specific areas.
- Select customers within specific areas.
- Select customers within drive times of a point.
- Select customers with a certain radius of a point.
- Using micro-geographic segmentation select customers similar to a specific type in the rest of the country.

== Applications ==
=== Different content by choice ===
Location-based social media marketing uses geo-specific tools to draw imaginary perimeters that will display all of the social content posted by users in that particular area. A typical example for different web content by location is the FedEx website at FedEx.com where users have the choice to select their country geo — location first and are then presented with different site or article content depending on their selection.

=== Automated different content ===
Individuals can deliver different content in internet marketing, and mobile app marketing through paid or organic search results, based on the geographical geolocation of the targeted audiences.

=== Other applications ===
- Solve problems regarding location of a new retail outlet
- Map consumer demand trends to best distribute products and advertising. This links with trade zone management.
- Scope digital advertising towards individual consumers and producers.
- Research consumer shopping patterns and observe traffic within shopping centers and between retail outlets. It also helps in visualisation of market research findings and help improve the overall planning ability of organisations.
- Improve customer cooperation.
- Creation of sales territories

We can define the geo-marketing as a strategy and mechanism that provides valuable information that helps in the process of making business decisions using geographical information. The functions of this to search and evaluate marketing opportunities, analyzing geographical information such as location residential areas, topography, it also analyzes demographic information such as age, genre, annual income and lifestyle. This information can be segmented as primary data and sub-segmented as secondary data; in addition, it helps us to develop successful promotional campaigns achieving our marketing goals. This also works with retail chain stores in the sales industry, real estate, and renewable energy, among others.

With geomarketing, the general data of a company changes to be more specific regarding their customers and market trends. This allows companies to use secondary data wisely, providing excellent results at low cost compared with traditional market research methods. All data is acquired accurately with GPS equipment and geographical information software, once the data is acquired, this information is processed by professionals in the field.

Geomarketing has helped companies to acquire valuable information such as transit behaviors, most visited places or areas, etc., this information will help these companies to deliver the right message (or promotion), at the right time and place. Most companies use their mobile apps to obtain this information. Mobile apps became more sophisticated using GPS, Bluetooth, and also social networks to obtain their market information, this information helps to improve their promotional campaigns. According to comScore, about 60 percent of all Internet activities in the U.S. originates from mobile devices and about half of total Internet traffic flows through mobile apps.

One example of Geo Location is Google Maps — you can search in Google Maps Restaurants near me and it will show different options around your location. One important factor that companies (in this case restaurants) is that they must be sure to optimize their business in Google's directory list. Another mapping for-profit service that provides geomarketing solutions such as business density, commercial enhancement or employment policy for economical urban planning is the Catalan observatory EIXOS.

== See also ==
- Digital marketing
- Geotargeting
- GSM localization
- Local advertising
- Location-based advertising
- Location-based service
- Location intelligence

== Bibliography ==
- Amaduzzi S., Geomarketing. I sistemi informativi territoriali SIT - GIS a supporto delle aziende e della pubblica amministrazione, Roma, EPC editore 2011, ISBN 978-88-6310-311-3, https://web.archive.org/web/20120408195416/http://www.amaduzzi.it/geomarketing/
- Maguire D., Kouyoumjian V., Smith R., The Business Benefits of GIS - An ROI Approach, ESRI Press, 2008.
- Peterson K., The power of place - Advanced customer and location analytics for market planning, Integras, 2004
- Cliquet G., Geomarketing - Methods and Strategies in Spatial Marketing, Iste, 2002.
