= Google Business Groups =

Nonprofit organization

- Type: Nonprofit organization
- Website: https://www.google.com/landing/gbg

Google Business Groups (GBG) is a non-profit community of business professionals to share knowledge about web technologies for business success. It has over 150 local communities or chapters in various cities including: Mumbai, Bangalore, Belgaum, Chandigarh, Jaipur, Piura, Chennai, Buenos Aires, Davao, Cape Town, Rio de Janeiro, Yaba, Lekki, Ikeja, Peshawar, Lahore, Jos, Ado-Ekiti, Uyo, Accra and GBG FCT - Abuja e.t.c spanning across 30 countries around the world. The initiative was started by and is backed by Google, but is driven by local chapter managers and the community members to connect, learn and impact the overall success of their businesses.

== BIZFEST ==
In 2019, the Google Business Group held its Business Festival, BIZFEST, across 30 countries in almost all of its 150 local chapters.

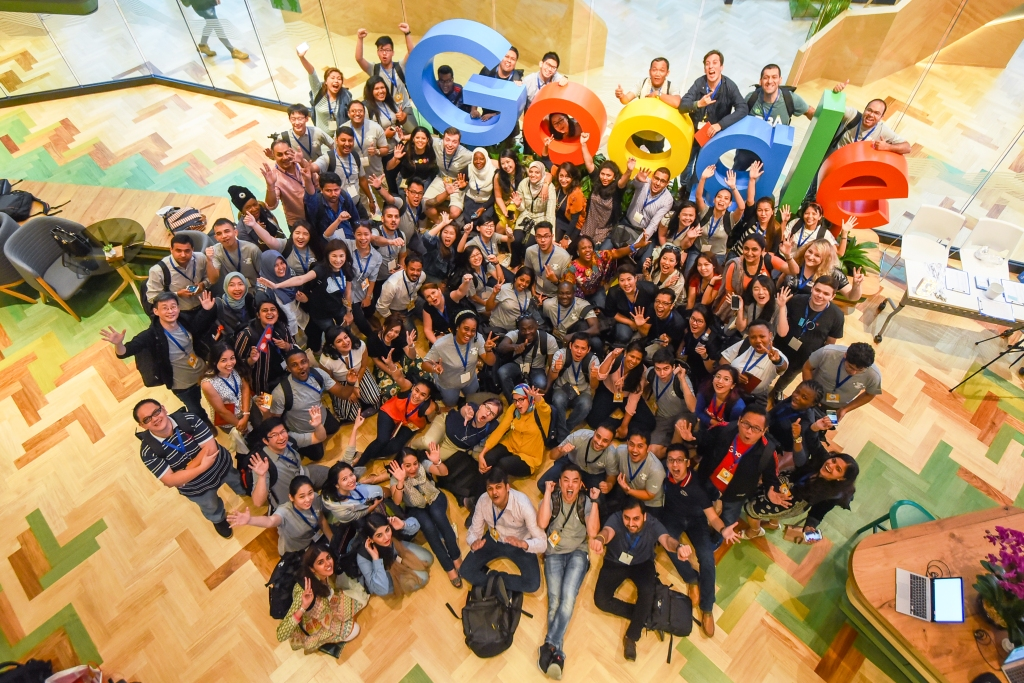
Global Summit in Singapore

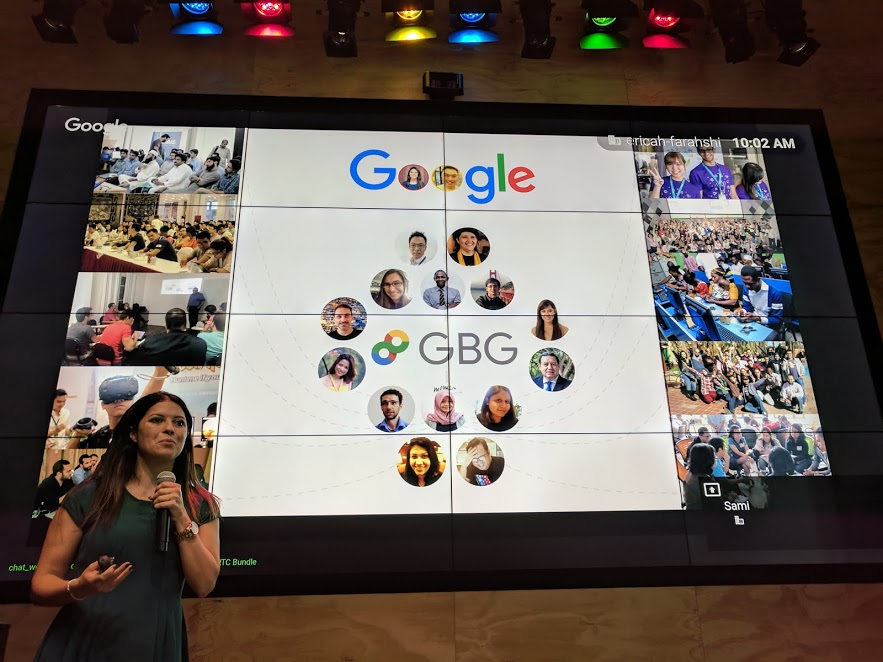
Global Summit Attractions

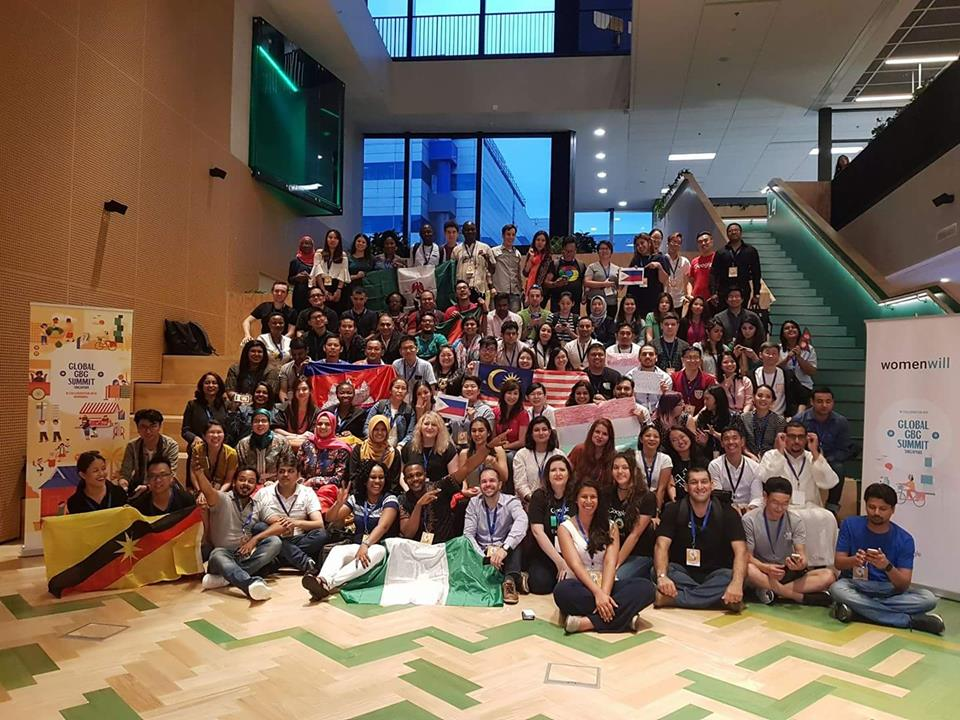
Global Summit Attractions

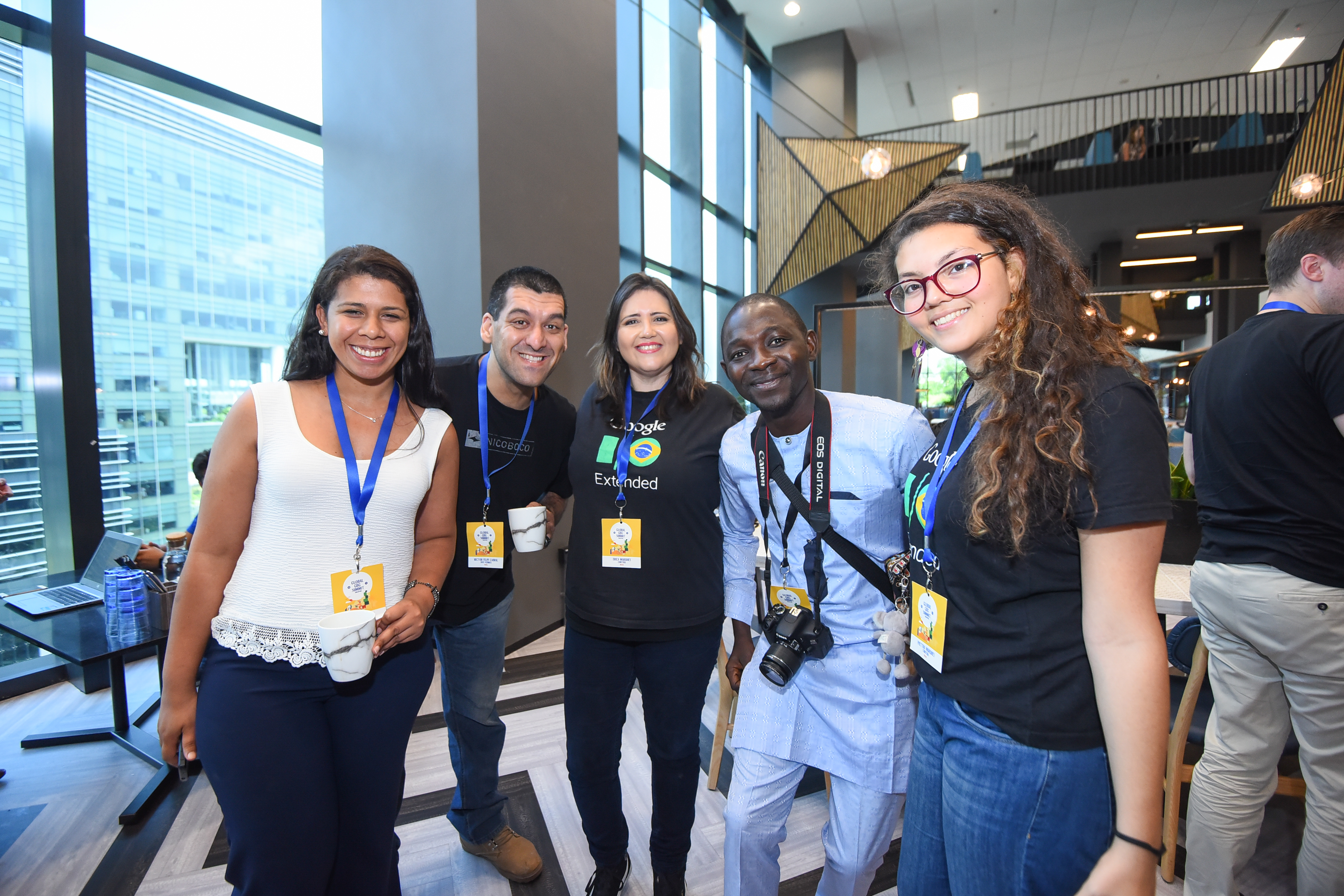
Community Members & Leads

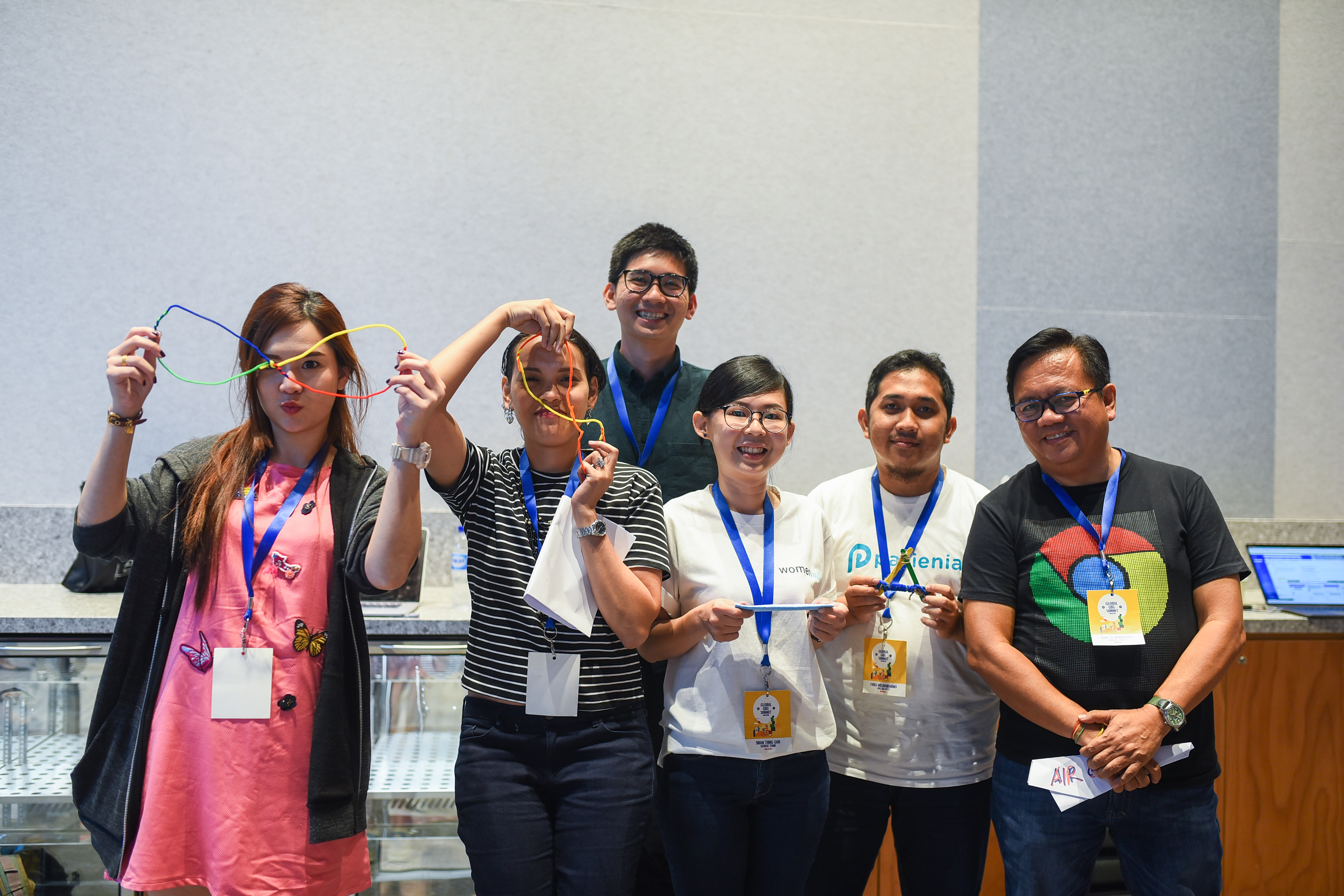
Other Community Leads

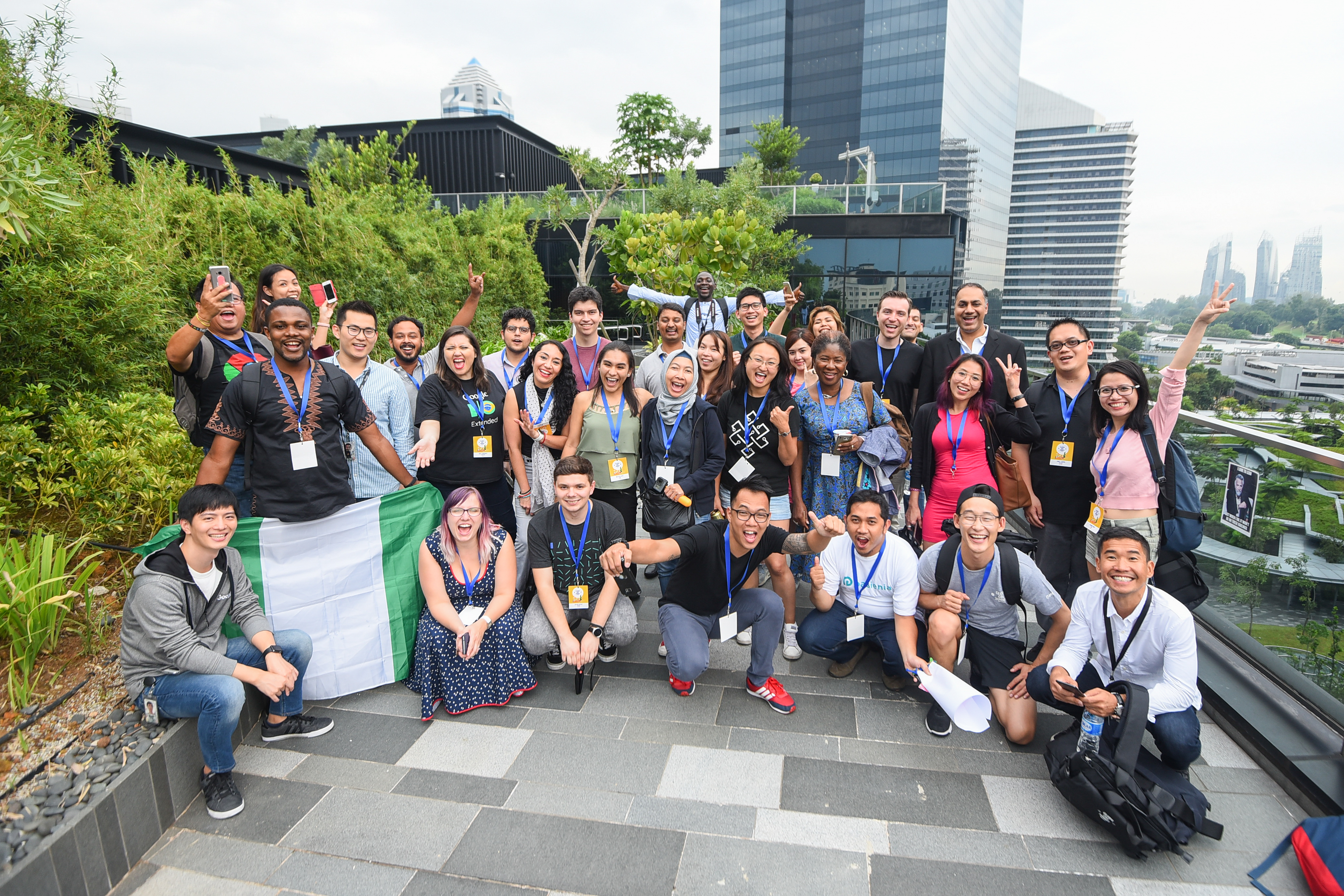
Outstanding Community Leads
