= Mobilewalla =

Mobilewalla, Inc.
- Company type: Private
- Industry: Data broker
- Founded: March 7, 2011; 14 years ago in Singapore
- Founder: Anindya Datta
- Headquarters: Chamblee, Georgia
- Website: mobilewalla.com

Mobilewalla is an American data broker company that collects and sells mobile device data. It was founded in 2011 by Dr. Anindya Datta, a professor with the School of Computing, National University of Singapore.

During 2016 US elections, the firm targeted evangelicals with cell phone locations in real time of 6 months preceding the election.

End of May 2020, the firm targeted George Floyd protesters located in New York, Los Angeles, Minneapolis and Atlanta and published a report 2 weeks after showing demographics data: ethnicity, gender and age distribution. Datta proffered that the report was prepared to satisfy the curiosity of its employees, and not on behest of any law enforcement or public agency. This however prompted various legislators to seek further clarifications with the company on the data itself.

In December 2024, the Federal Trade Commission filed a complaint against Mobilewalla alleging multiple violations of consumer protection laws.
