= Shared ranch =

The shared ranch concept takes a large tract of land used for agricultural purposes and converts it into a smaller parcels for residential use. Usually several hundred acres are set aside for the owners of the parcels to share. On this common area are all the amenities of the shared ranch. Amenities can range from a barn and riding arena to lavish guest cabins with a clubhouse. All of the facilities and grounds are maintained by a ranch manager and some shared ranches have their own concierge service to cater to the owner's needs and help with property management needs.

== Activities ==
Most shared ranches will offer the popular outdoor activities on site. Fly fishing, Equestrian, ATVs, and sporting clays. While nearby activities include hunting, hiking, mountain biking and river rafting. Some shared ranches will be near ski mountains and offer snowmobiling. Other activities can include, spelunking, rodeos, and golf.

== Amenities ==
They are tangible benefits of owning in a shared ranch and provide comfort and convenience. These could include a guest cabin, clubhouse for private dinners, workout facilities, on site masseuse, private chefs, maid service, ranch manager, and concierge services. These services make ranch life less rustic and more luxurious.

== Homeowners' association ==
The common area, the cost to maintain the common area, utilities, taxes, insurance, and the ranch manager's salary are all shared by the homeowners and divided up billed to owners as homeowners' association dues. Splitting the cost reduces the amount an owner spends compared to the entire bill for a ranch and to ensure it is maintained and protected in the owner's absence.

== Owners ==
Shared ranches along the Rocky Mountains sell their ranches mainly to buyers from California, Texas, Arizona and Minnesota. People looking for a slower-paced life, wide open spaces and outdoor recreation make the move to a shared ranch out West. The demographic of owners in shared ranches are 50–65 years old, married, hunt and fish more than twice a year, own their business or retired, and have traveled to the West before.

== Valuation of a Shared Ranch ==
Shared ranches are the top tier of investment grade property categories accounting for 3% of the market. An example could be bordered by state and/or national forest and parks. They are generally rectangular in shape and has a good-sized stream that flows through it, then through the neighboring ranch, emptying into a river with a very good trout fishing reputation. They have great mountain views, and there are numerous meadows and irrigated creek bottom areas. The more of the following attributes a shared ranch has generally adds to the price.

- Mountain views
- Recreational opportunities (hunting, fishing, skiing, horseback riding)
- Sporting clay course
- Live water on the property
- High quality improvements
- Urban service proximity (medical, retail conveniences, entertainment)
- Equestrian facilities
- Ranch manager
- Clubhouse/Lodge
- Private chef
- Workout facilities
- Concierge service
- Owner/guest cabin
- On-site Masseuse
- Access to a nearby private ranch for additional recreational opportunities
