= LocationSmart =

- Company type: Private
- Industry: location as a service
- Founded: 1995
- Founders: Masoud Motamedi; Mario Proietti
- Headquarters: Carlsbad, California
- Parent: TechnoCom Corporation
- Website: https://www.locationsmart.com

LocationSmart, originally called TechnoCom Location Platform, is a location-as-a-service (LaaS) company based in Carlsbad, California, that provides location APIs to enterprises and operates a secure, cloud-based and privacy-protected platform. In February 2015, it acquired a competitor, Locaid.

LocationSmart provides near real-time location data for devices including smartphones, feature phones, tablets, M2M, IoT and other connected devices on Tier 1 and Tier 2 wireless networks in the U.S. and Canada. This includes AT&T, Verizon Wireless, T-Mobile US, Sprint Corporation, MetroPCS, U.S. Cellular, Rogers Communications, Bell Canada and Telus.

== History ==
Founded in 1995, TechnoCom Corporation was headquartered in Los Angeles and called one of the area's fastest growing companies in 2003 by Deloitte & Touche. In 2012, the TechnoCom Location Platform was rebranded as LocationSmart.

On May 17, 2018, media outlets reported that the LocationSmart website allowed anyone to obtain the realtime location of any cell phone using any of the major U.S. wireless carriers (including AT&T, Verizon, T-Mobile, and Sprint), as well as some Canadian carriers, to within a few hundred yards, given only the phone number. Approximately 200 million customers may have been exposed. No consent was required, and there was no ability to opt-out. In addition, the data could be requested by anyone anonymously, with no authentication, authorization, or payment required. Security researcher Robert Xiao, who discovered the vulnerability, stated that the LocationSmart API failed to implement basic checks and that the vulnerability could have been found by anyone with little effort. In response, LocationSmart took the vulnerable service offline and claimed the company "takes privacy seriously".

== Clients ==
LocationSmart uses a variety of location methods that include cellular network location, Wi-Fi location, IP address location, landline location, hybrid location via a software development kit (SDK), browser location and global site identification (GSID) location.

LocationSmart provides location services for enterprises and Fortune 500 companies. LocationSmart is also used by US states to offer online gaming within the state borders.

LocationSmart is a member of CTIA, the Transportation Intermediaries Association (TIA), and the International Association of Privacy Professionals (IAPP).

== See also ==
- Location-based service
- Location as a Service
