= 118 118 (Sweden) =

Directory assistance services provider

118 118 is a directory assistance services provider in Sweden both in operator based services as well as in interactive SMS based services. Eniro118118 is owned by the Eniro Group, who is a provider of Yellow Pages in Sweden, Norway, Denmark and Poland. Eniro118118 received several industry awards, such as 118Award in 2004, 2005, 2006 and 2007.

The firm is not related to the similarly numbered service in the UK.

== See also ==
- Telephone numbers in Sweden
