= Eniro =

Swedish digital marketing company

Eniro Group AB
- Type: Publicly traded aktiebolag (publ)
- Traded as: Nasdaq Stockholm: ENRO
- Industry: Digital marketing
- Founded: 2000; 26 years ago
- Headquarters: Solna, Sweden
- Key people: Fredric Forsman (chairman); Hosni Teque-Omeirat (president and CEO)
- Services: Digital marketing services, search and directory services
- Revenue: ▲SEK 955 million (2025)
- Operating income: ▼SEK 55 million (2025)
- Net income: ▼SEK 46 million (2025)
- Number of employees: 832 (2025)
- Website: enirogroup.com

Eniro Group AB (publ) is a Swedish digital marketing company headquartered in Solna, Stockholm County, and listed on Nasdaq Stockholm. The company provides digital marketing services to small and medium-sized enterprises (SMEs) in the Nordic countries, built around the Robin platform, and operates local search and directory services such as eniro.se in Sweden, gulesider.no in Norway, and krak.dk and degulesider.dk in Denmark. In 2025 the group reported net sales of SEK 955 million and annual recurring revenue (ARR) of SEK 537 million, with about 45,000 paying SME customers. The name Eniro is Esperanto and means "access".

== History ==
Eniro was formed in July 2000 when several directory businesses within the Telia group were gathered in the parent company Eniro AB, and was listed on the Stockholm Stock Exchange on 10 October 2000. During the 2000s the company expanded in the Nordic region through acquisitions, including the Norwegian directory company Findexa (2005) and the Danish publisher Kraks Forlag (2007). Following years of declining revenue from printed directories and a period of financial distress in the 2010s, Eniro underwent a corporate restructuring in 2020 in which more than half a billion SEK of non-priority debt was written down.

In May 2022, board member Hosni Teque-Omeirat was appointed acting president and CEO; the appointment became permanent on 1 July 2022. The same year, Eniro redeemed all of its preference shares and moved to a single share class, and Fredric Forsman became chairman of the board. The nautical chart app Eniro På sjön was sold to the Swedish boat-tech company Skippo in 2022.

In May 2024, Eniro launched Robin, a "team as a service" offering giving SMEs access to dedicated marketing teams. The same month, Eniro entered a strategic partnership with the digital advertising company Azerion, which acquired a 26 percent stake in Eniro. For the full year 2024, Eniro reported its best result in eleven years, with EBITDA of SEK 143 million.

In 2024–2026, Eniro made several acquisitions of Nordic marketing agencies, including the Finnish companies Medialuotsi (2024), Qwamplify Nordics (2025), Mainostoimisto SST (2026) and Aste (2026). In July 2025 the company reported that ARR in its Marketing Partner business area had passed SEK 0.5 billion.

In February 2026, Eniro reached a settlement with the shareholder association Kapatens regarding the 2022 redemption of preference shares, under which Eniro paid SEK 17 million; the Supreme Court of Sweden subsequently set aside the lower courts' rulings in accordance with the settlement. In May 2026, a new claim of SEK 28.7 million concerning the same redemption was filed against the company.

In May 2026, the investment company Flavus Invest became Eniro's largest owner with 25.46 percent of the capital after acquiring Azerion's shareholding. A 1:50 reverse stock split was carried out in June 2026. In August 2026, Eniro sold its customer service subsidiary Dynava to Servana AB for SEK 102 million and became a company focused entirely on digital marketing. In October 2026, the board proposed an extraordinary dividend of SEK 2.50 per share and adopted a policy to distribute 60 percent of the group's operating cash flow to shareholders annually.

== Operations ==
Following the sale of Dynava in 2026, Eniro consists of one business area: digital marketing for small and medium-sized enterprises in the Nordic region, organised around the Robin platform and brand. The group operates in Sweden, Finland, Denmark and Norway and reported about 45,000 paying SME customers and more than 3 million listed companies in its database. Eniro also operates local search and directory services, including eniro.se in Sweden, gulesider.no in Norway, and krak.dk and degulesider.dk in Denmark. In April 2026, Eniro announced a partnership with the Swedish AI company Sana to develop AI agents for its marketing services.

== Ownership ==
As of May 2026, the largest owner is the investment company Flavus Invest with 25.46 percent of the capital, followed by Mats and Eva Qviberg with 17.1 percent. President and CEO Hosni Teque-Omeirat holds just over 5 percent of the shares after acquiring 35 million shares in May 2026.
