= Local search (Internet) =

Use of specialized Internet search engines

Local search is the use of specialized Internet search engines that allow users to submit geographically constrained searches against a structured database of local business listings. Typical local search queries include not only information about "what" the site visitor is searching for (such as keywords, a business category, or the name of a consumer product) but also "where" information, such as a street address, city name, postal code, or geographic coordinates like latitude and longitude. Examples of local searches include "Hong Kong hotels", "Manhattan restaurants", and "Dublin car rental". Local searches exhibit explicit or implicit local intent. A search that includes a location modifier, such as "Bellevue, WA" or "14th arrondissement", is an explicit local search. A search that references a product or service that is typically consumed locally, such as "restaurant" or "nail salon", is an implicit local search.

Local searches on Google Search typically return organic results prefaced with a 'local 3-pack', a list of three local results. More local results can be obtained by clicking on “more places” under the 3-pack. The list of results one obtains is also called the Local Finder.

Search engines and directories are primarily supported by advertising from businesses that wish to be prominently featured when users search for specific products and services in specific locations. Google for instance, has developed local inventory ads and features ads in the local pack. Local search advertising can be highly effective because it allows ads to be targeted very precisely to the search terms and location provided by the user.

== Evolution ==
Local search is the natural evolution of traditional offline advertising, typically distributed by newspaper publishers and TV and radio broadcasters, to the Web. Historically, consumers relied on local newspapers and local TV and radio stations to find local products and services. With the advent of the Web, consumers are increasingly using search engines to find these local products and services online. In recent years, the number of local searches online has grown rapidly while off-line information searches, such as print Yellow Page lookups, have declined. As a natural consequence of this shift in consumer behavior, local product, and service providers are slowly shifting their advertising investments from traditional off-line media to local search engines.

== Of directories, search engines and maps ==
One can search for local information via search engines. These often return local search results from directories and maps. Google for instance, will present results from its directory (called Google Business Profile) in Google Maps and also in the search engine results pages in the form of a local pack. One can also look for local information by searching Apple Maps Search engines offer local businesses the possibility to upload their business data to their respective local search databases.

Other local search engines adjunct to major web search portals include general Windows Live Local, Yahoo! Local, and ask.com's AskCity. Yahoo!, for example, separates its local search engine features into Yahoo! Local and Yahoo! Maps, the former being focused on business data and correlating it with web data, the latter focused primarily on the map features (e.g. directions, larger map, navigation).

Local search, like ordinary search, can be applied in two ways. As John Battelle coined it in his book "The Search," search can be either recovery search or discovery search.

This perfect search also has perfect recall – it knows what you’ve seen, and can discern between a journey of discovery – where you want to find something new – and recovery – where you want to find something you’ve seen before.

This applies especially to local searches. Recovery search implies, for example, that a consumer knows who she is looking for (i.e., Main Street Pizza Parlor) but she does not know where they are, or needs their phone number. Discovery search implies that the searcher knows, for example, what she wants but not who she needs it from (i.e., pizza on Main Street in Springfield).

In February 2012, Google announced that they made 40 changes to their search algorithm, including one codenamed "Venice" which Google states will improve local search results by "relying more on the ranking of (Google's) main search results as a signal", meaning local search will now rely more on organic SERPs (Search Engine Result Pages).

== Local search results ==
Google can show a business's information in mobile or desktop google search results, or/and in mobile and desktop google maps results. Local search results displayed by google often include a local pack, that currently displays three listings.

Local search optimization involves improving the online information and signals that help search engines associate a business with relevant geographic searches. Common practices include maintaining accurate business information, optimizing business listings, managing local citations, improving location-specific website content, and maintaining business profiles. Reviews, links from relevant websites, business categorization, and other local signals may also influence how businesses are represented in local search results.

== Ranking factors ==
Major search engines have algorithms that determine which local businesses rank in local search. Primary factors that impact a local business's chance of appearing in local search are proper categorization in business directories, a business's name, address, and phone number (NAP) being crawlable on the website, and citations (mentions of the small business on other relevant websites like a chamber of commerce website).

In 2016, a study using statistical analysis assessed how and why businesses ranked in the local packs and identified positive correlations between local rankings and 100+ ranking factors. Although the study can't replicate Google's algorithm, it did deliver several interesting findings:

- backlinks showed the most important correlation (and also Google's Toolbar PageRank, suggesting that older links are an advantage since the Toolbar has not been updated in a long time)
- Sites with more content (hence more keywords) tended to fare better (as expected), especially when the page has the local cities name within the text content and meta data
- Quality of citations such as low number of duplicates, consistency and also a fair number of citations, mattered for a business to show in local packs. However, for businesses within the pack, citations did not influence their ranking: “citations appear to be foundational but not a competitive advantage."
- Having a verified Google Business Profile Page with reviews and photos also showed a positive correlation (with ranking)
- The authors were instead surprised that geotargeting elements (city and state) in the title of the Google Business Profile landing page did not have any impact on Google Business Profile rankings. Hence they suggest to use them only if it makes sense for usability reasons.
- Keywords in a business name carry significant weight in local search algorithms, and have led to a rise in business name spam.

In December 2021's Vicinity Update, Google announced on Twitter that it had updated its local search algorithm which "involved a rebalancing of various factors we consider in generating local search results." It placed more importance on proximity as a ranking factor and decreased the significance of adding keywords in a business name on Google Business Profile.

== Private label local search ==
Traditional local media companies, including newspaper publishers and television and radio broadcasters, are starting to add local search to their local websites to attract their share of local search traffic and advertising revenues in the markets they serve. These local media companies either develop their own technology or license "private label" or "white label" local search solutions from third-party local search solution providers. In either case, local media companies base their solution on business listing databases developed in-house or licensed from a third-party data publisher.

== Social local search ==
Local search that incorporates internal or external social signals could be considered social local search-driven. The first site to incorporate this type of search was Explore To Yellow Pages. Explore To uses Facebook Likes as one of the signals to increase the ranking of listings where other factors may be equal or almost equal. Typical ranking signals in local searches, such as keyword relevancy and distance from centroid can, therefore, be layered with these social signals to give a better crowdsourced experience for users. More recently, social media sites Facebook, Foursquare, LocalMate and Zappenin have become more directly involved in local search by updating their mobile apps with features to help people discover new businesses to visit.

== Mobile local search ==
Several providers experimented with providing local search for mobile devices, but on March 5, 2020, Google was the first to announce mobile-first indexing by default shifting the focus of optimization from desktop to mobile. Some of these are location aware. In the United States, Google previously operated an experimental voice-based locative service (1-800-GOOG-411) but terminated the service in November, 2010. Many mobile web portals require the subscriber to download a small Java application, however, the recently added .mobi top-level domain has given impetus to the development of mobile-targeted search sites are based upon a standard mobile-specific XML protocol that all modern mobile browsers understand. The advantage of mobile responsive website development is that no software needs to be downloaded and installed, plus these sites may be designed to simultaneously provide conventional content to traditional PC users using automatic browser detection.

== Business owners and local search ==
Electronic publishers (such as businesses or individuals) who would like information such as their name, address, phone number, website, business description and business hours to appear on local search engines have several options. The most reliable way to include accurate local business information is to start claiming business listings through Google's, Yahoo!'s, or Bings's respective local business centers.

Business listing information can also be distributed via the traditional Yellow Pages, electronic Yellow Page-style data aggregators, and search engine optimization services. Some search engines will pick up on web pages that contain regular street addresses displayed in machine-readable text (rather than a picture of text, which is more difficult to interpret). Web pages can also use geotagging techniques.

== Google Business Profile ==
On May 30, 2012, Google launched Google+ Local, a simple way to discover and share local information featuring Zagat scores and recommendations from the people you trust on Google+.

On June 11, 2014, Google launched Google Business Profile which replaced Google+ Local. Google Business Profile has more features and connects with AdWords to make an all-in-one small business online management center.

Reviews on Google Business Profile can be written by anyone regardless of whether they have actually had experience with the business. It's not uncommon for less honorable "reputation management" companies to post fraudulent negative reviews and then call the business offering to remove the fake reviews for a fee. Google has a posted policy that states all reviews "should accurately represent the location in question. Where contributions distort the truth, we will remove content." In reality, the Google Business Profile support staff almost never removes fraudulent reviews and appears to be more interested in encouraging business owners to spend money on Adwords than in actually ensuring the accuracy of the Google Business Profile information.

== See also ==
- hCard (protocol for adding local info to web pages)
- Local advertising
