= Location intelligence =

In business intelligence, location intelligence (LI), or spatial intelligence, is the process of deriving meaningful insight from geospatial data relationships to solve a particular problem. It involves layering multiple data sets spatially and/or chronologically, for easy reference on a map, and its applications span industries, categories and organizations.

Maps have been used to represent information throughout the ages, but what might be referenced as the first example of true location 'intelligence' was in London in 1854 when John Snow was able to debunk theories about the spread of cholera by overlaying a map of the area with the location of water pumps and was able to narrow the source to a single water pump. This layering of information over a map was able to identify relationships between different sets of geospatial data.

Location or geographical information system (GIS) tools enable spatial experts to collect, store, analyze and visualize data. Location intelligence experts can use a variety of spatial and business analytical tools to measure optimal locations for operating a business or providing a service. Location intelligence experts begin with defining the business ecosystem which has many interconnected economic influences. Such economic influences include but are not limited to culture, lifestyle, labor, healthcare, cost of living, crime, economic climate and education.

== Further definitions ==
The term "location intelligence" is often used to describe the people, data and technology employed to geographically "map" information. These mapping applications like Polaris Intelligence can transform large amounts of data linked to location (e.g. POIs, demographics, geofences) into color-coded visual representations (heat maps and thematic maps of variables of interest) that make it easy to see trends and generate meaningful intelligence. The creation of location intelligence is directed by domain knowledge, formal frameworks, and a focus on decision support. Location cuts across everything i.e. devices, platforms, software and apps, and is one of the most important ingredients of understanding context in sync with social data, mobile data, user data, sensor data.

Location intelligence is also used to describe the integration of a geographical component into business intelligence processes and tools, often incorporating spatial database and spatial OLAP tools.

In 2012, Wayne Gearey from the real estate industry (JLL) offered the first applied course on location intelligence at the University of Texas at Dallas in which he defined location intelligence as the process for selecting the optimal location that will support workplace success and address a variety of business and financial objectives.

Pitney Bowes MapInfo Corporation describes location intelligence as follows: "Spatial information, commonly known as "Location", relates to involving, or having the nature of where. Spatial is not constrained to a geographic location however most common business uses of spatial information deal with how spatial information is tied to a location on the earth. Miriam-Webster® defines Intelligence as "The ability to learn or understand, or the ability to apply knowledge to manipulate one`s environment." Combining these terms alludes to how you achieve an understanding of the spatial aspect of information and apply it to achieve a significant competitive advantage."

Definition by Esri is as follows: "Location intelligence is achieved via visualization and analysis of data. By adding layers of geographic data—such as demographics, traffic, and weather—to a smart map or dashboard, organizations can use intelligence tools to identify where an event has taken place, understand why it is happening, and gain insight into what caused it."

Definition by Yankee Group within their White Paper "Location Intelligence in Retail Banking: "...a business management term that refers to spatial data visualization, contextualization and analytical capabilities applied to solve a business problem."

== Commercial applications ==
Location intelligence is used by a broad range of industries to improve overall business results. Applications include:

- Communications and telecommunications: Network planning and design, boundary identification, identifying new customer markets.
- Financial services: Optimize branch locations, market analysis, share of wallet and cross-sell activities, mergers & acquisitions, industry sector analysis, risk management.
- Government: Census updates, law enforcement crime analysis, emergency response, environmental and land management, electoral redistricting, tax jurisdiction assignment, urban planning.
- Healthcare: Site selection, market segmentation, network analysis, growth assessments, spread of disease.
- Higher education: Student Recruitment, Alumni & Donor Tracking, Campus Mapping.
- Hotels and restaurants: Customer profile analysis, site selection, target marketing, expansion planning.
- Insurance: Address validation, underwriting and risk management, claims management, marketing and sales analysis, market penetration studies.
- K-12: School site selection, enrollment planning, school attendance area modification (boundary change), school consolidation, district consolidation, student achievement plotting.
- Media: Target market identification, subscriber demographics, media planning.
- Real estate: Site reports, comprehensive site analysis, demographic analysis, growth pattern analysis, retail modeling, presentation quality maps.
- Retail: Site selection, maximize per-store sales, identify under-performing stores, market analysis, retail leakage and supply gap analysis.
- Transportation: Transport planning, route monitoring.

== See also ==
- Geographic information system (GIS)
- Geomarketing
