= List of geolocation-based video games =

This is a list of geolocation-based video games, also known as location-based video games. Games on this list typically run on a mobile phone and use GPS for geolocation. Some games on this list also have augmented reality features.

Title	Platform	Developer/Publisher	Release date	Notes
Tycoon LIVE	iOS, Android	Mobimetry	2026-10-13	A location-based mobile strategy game powered by real-world data
BotFighters	SMS	It's Alive Mobile Games AB!	2001-03-14	One of the first location-based games
Xyber Mech	SMS	one2tribe	2005-04-20	Was available on Polish GSM network Plus GSM. Discontinued in 2009.
SpecTrek	Android	Games4All	2009	
Shadow Cities	iOS	Grey Area	2010	Discontinued
Turf (video game)	iOS, Android	Andrimon	2010-07-10	
Ingress & Ingress Prime	iOS, Android	Niantic	2013-12-14	Has augmented reality functionality and real-world events.
Colors	Gizmondo, iOS, Android	Indie Studios	N/A	Game was cancelled and later released separately
Pokémon Go	iOS, Android	Niantic	2016-07-06	Also has augmented reality functionality
Maguss	iOS, Android	Mawa	2018-02	Discontinued
Jurassic World Alive	iOS, Android	Ludia	2018	
Ghostbusters World	iOS, Android	NextAge	2018	Discontinued
The Walking Dead: Our World	iOS, Android	Next Games	2018	Discontinued
Harry Potter: Wizards Unite	iOS, Android	Niantic, WB Games San Francisco	2019	Discontinued
Dragon Quest Walk	iOS, Android	COLOPL, Square Enix	2019	Available in Japan only
Let's Hunt Monsters	iOS, Android	TiMi Studio Group, Tencent Games	2019	
Five Nights at Freddy's AR: Special Delivery	iOS, Android	Illumix	2019	Discontinued
Minecraft Earth	iOS, Android	Mojang Studios	2019	Discontinued
WeWard	iOS, Android	WeWard	2019	Step tracker with geolocation additions
Catan: World Explorers	iOS, Android	Niantic, Catan GmbH	2020	Discontinued
Pikmin Bloom	iOS, Android	Niantic	2021	Collaboration with Nintendo
Transformers: Heavy Metal	iOS, Android	Niantic	N/A	Cancelled in 2022 before the real launch.
Parallel Kingdom	iOS, Android	PerBlue	2008	Discontinued 2014

== See also ==
- Gbanga, a geolocation-based social gaming platform featuring multiple games
- Curzon Memories App
