= Persistent world =

Virtual world which exists without human interaction

A persistent world, or persistent-state world (PSW), is a virtual world which, by the definition given by Richard Bartle, "continues to exist and develop internally even when there are no people interacting with it". The first virtual worlds were text-based and often called MUDs, but the term is frequently used in relation to massively multiplayer online role-playing games (MMORPGs) and pervasive games. Examples of persistent worlds that exist in video games include Battle Dawn, EVE Online, and Realms of Trinity.

A persistent world can be achieved by developing and maintaining a single or dynamic instance state of the game world that is shared and viewed by all players around the clock. The persistence of a world can be subdivided into "game persistence", "world persistence" and "data persistence". Data persistence ensures that any world data is not lost in the event of computer system failure. World persistence means the world continues to exist and is available to players when they want to access it. Game persistence refers to the persistence of game events within the world (a Groundhog Day MUD is a virtual world where the entire (game) world is reset periodically). When referring to a "persistent world", world and game persistence are sometimes used interchangeably. The persistence criterion is the trait that separates virtual worlds from other types of video games.

== Pervasive games ==
The real world is persistent. The game world of a pervasive game takes place in the real world and so pervasive games are also persistent. In other words, pervasive games share the persistence trait with virtual worlds. An example of a pervasive game that makes heavy use of a virtual world is Can You See Me Now?, where street runners exist in a virtual world while simultaneously running around the real physical world; the game was persistent during play, as well as the virtual world.

== Simulated persistence ==
To give the illusion that the game world is always available, persistence can be simulated. This can be achieved by scheduling when players are allowed to play, around times when the world is offline, or as in the Animal Crossing series, having the game generate events that could have happened during the period of inactivity. Aside from virtual worlds, the simulation of a persistent world is also possible in single player games. In Noctis, players are advised to turn off the game while refueling because it takes so long. In addition, if a player who has landed on a planet stops playing and then after a while resumes, he or she can see visible changes in the sea level or the daytime/nighttime cycle.

A form of simulated persistence referred to as "pseudo-persistence" has been used in both video games and pervasive games. Pseudo-persistence means making relevant world data available when the relevant players reconnect to the world instance. In a mobile game, a virtual world might exist on a distributed collection of mobile devices. If a player reconnects to a device they previously connected to, they find that their relevant world data is still present. In the video game Destiny, a World Server provides the persistent world data for the game instances (called "bubbles"), which are created on demand as a number of players are matched to play the game together.. The term 'persistent world' is frequently used by players of Neverwinter Nights (2002) and Neverwinter Nights 2 (2006) to refer to MMORPG-like online environments created using the toolkit.

== First virtual worlds ==
The first multi-player game to demonstrate on-line persistence was the text-based MUD1 written in 1978 by Rob Trubshaw and Richard Bartle. Initially only available for a few hours in off-peak time at Essex University, UK, it featured a world reset every 105 minutes. Nevertheless, it persisted independent of players logging in for the time it was running. The subsequent decade saw many on-line worlds clone this template, but all featured variations on timed resets and reboots or did not allow players to retain objects within the game other than running point totals such as treasure or experience points as a marker of progress.

Avalon: The Legend Lives can be considered the first game to introduce a true persistent state world in 1989. Avalon pioneered the ability for items to be retained by the player whilst offline while the Avalon realm at large continued 24/7 with only a morning backup to mark the world pausing briefly. It is currently the longest running online virtual world.

== See also ==
- Instance dungeon
