= Transreality game =

Video game played in real and virtual environments

A transreality game, sometimes written as trans-reality game, describes a type of video game or a mode of gameplay that combines playing a game in a virtual environment with game-related, physical experiences in the real world and vice versa. In this approach a player evolves and moves seamlessly through various physical and virtual stages, brought together in one unified game space. Alongside the rising trend of gamification, the application of game mechanics to tasks that are not traditionally associated with play, a transreality approach to gaming incorporates mechanics that extend over time and space, effectively playing through a players day-to-day interactions.

The essential part of transreality gaming is considered to be the fluidity between physical and virtual stages of gameplay, making it more and more difficult to see the distinction between what is allegedly 'virtual' and what is allegedly 'real' while playing. Looking at a transreality game from that perspective it may also integrate (big) data feeds into the storylines of games as a means to make the gameplay more immersive, like in the setup of Liping Xie's experimental scientific simulations in which a population of sample individuals search a real-world optimum in a virtual problem space, driven by real world forces in that space. Further on it could benefit from new layers of reality mining, connected intelligence and ubiquitous computing that incorporate machines into our lives like the Internet of things and wearable computing (both using sensors that are able to immediately re-create the actual world on and around a player on his or her device), cryptocurrencies, micropayments and nanopayments (for handling transmedial game credits), deployment of cleverbots, mind files and intelligent agent systems (to enhance the natural feel and learning skills of game characters) and games using kinetics (through motion controllers or through haptics).

Different authors have used the adjective 'transreal' as a starting point for the design of location-based games (like pervasive games, mixed reality games and augmented reality games) and cross media games (like simulation games, LARP and alternate reality games). All of these genres offer game experiences integrated with everyday routines and social networks. Its applications are to be found in serious games (education, awareness, skill training), gamification (like in production centers, marketing, research and testing) as well as in mobile multiplayer trans-reality games, MMTRG (including gamification of Foursquare), using the actual geolocation of the player in the gameplay, like in games such as Ingress, Pokémon Go, Shadow Cities, Zombies, Run!, YouCatch, Roads of San Francisco, City Race Munich and Parallel Kingdom.

From a broader perspective it is argued that different location aware and transmedial game formats may also be considered to merely provide a facilitating infrastructure for transreality gaming in a broader sense, positioned as a new way of looking at the design of game spaces, meant to be played across different realities rather than across different media.
