= Cluetivity =

Software platform

- Type: Private
- Industry: Leisure; video games
- Genre: Alternate reality games; Augmented reality games; Location-based games; Mobile games; Mixed reality games
- Founded: 2010; 16 years ago
- Headquarters: Berlin, Germany
- Key people: Michael Schiemann (CEO); Robert Wendel (CTO)
- Website: cluetivity.com

Cluetivity is a geolocation-based and augmented reality (AR) software platform developed by Life Action Games GmbH, headquartered in Berlin, Germany. Founded in 2010 by a group of scavenger hunt and technology enthusiasts, the company is best known for hybrid indoor and outdoor escape games designed for iPad devices. The platform integrates AR, GPS geolocation, and interactive storytelling to provide scalable activities for tourism, education, events, and hospitality. As of 2025, Cluetivity’s games have been adopted by more than 250 partners in 40 countries, with over three million players worldwide. The company is led by Chief Executive Officer Michael Schiemann.

== Gameplay and Technology ==
Cluetivity’s software combines AR-based puzzles, GPS navigation, and optional physical props to create immersive, location-based experiences. The optional prop kit, known as the ActionPack, includes items such as cipher disks and UV flashlights, which link digital gameplay with real-world tasks. Designed for Apple iPad devices, the games adapt dynamically to participants’ surroundings, often aligning challenges with cultural or natural landmarks. The platform supports both indoor and outdoor applications, enabling use in diverse settings such as museums, city centers, leisure resorts, and conference facilities. Group sizes may range from small families to more than 2,000 participants. Operators manage sessions through MyCluetivity, a backend system that allows route customization, live monitoring, and performance analysis.

== Games ==
Cluetivity offers six main ready-to-play titles, each with a distinct narrative and adaptable format. All titles can be localized into multiple languages and scaled for groups ranging from two to over 2,000 participants:

=== The Magic Portal (2016) ===
A fantasy-themed adventure game for families and children. Players close an open magical portal by solving location-based riddles and collecting crystals across the city. The story adapts to landmarks and offers a non-violent, family-friendly experience.

=== Operation Mindfall (2017) ===
A spy thriller in which players act as agents in a race to stop a global mind-control virus. Gameplay includes encrypted messages, espionage tools, and AR-driven hacking sequences. The game supports team building and corporate training scenarios.

=== Blackout (2022) ===
A cybersecurity-themed mission where a citywide blackout must be traced to its source. Players can use digital and physical clues to restore the city’s systems. Commonly used in educational or corporate training environments.

=== Treasure Hunters (2024) ===
A pirate-themed game inspired by historical treasure legends. Players decipher maps, explore cultural landmarks, and recover lost treasures. It is popular among tourism agencies, campsites and city explorers.

=== Christmas Adventures (2024) ===
A holiday-themed experience in which players must help Santa recover lost presents and save Christmas. Designed for use at holiday markets and community festivals.

=== Bachelor Royale (2025) ===
Targeted at stag and hen groups, this urban game includes humorous missions tied to nightlife venues and city landmarks. The experience promotes group bonding and is customizable per city.

== Business Model and Licensing ==
Cluetivity operates on a business-to-business licensing model that allows organizations to adopt its software for commercial purposes. The City License grants exclusive rights within a defined urban area, while the Educational License provides discounted access for schools, universities, and museums. Through Custom Game Development, partners can commission tailored experiences aligned with local landmarks, history, or branding. Cluetivity offers a franchise-like model that provides regional exclusivity across multiple territories. Unlike traditional franchises, this system uses a fixed license fee rather than royalties, while still including training and operational support for partners.

== Industries Served ==
Cluetivity’s platform is used in tourism, events, hospitality, and education. Escape rooms extend traditional gameplay to city streets and outdoor areas. Tour operators and cultural institutions employ its games to enrich city tours and heritage routes with interactive storytelling, while corporate event agencies apply them in team-building and training programs. Resorts, campsites, and leisure parks integrate the platform to diversify entertainment and enhance guest engagement and schools, universities and museums use it to support interactive learning in language, history, science, and cultural education.

== See also ==
- Augmented reality
- Escape room
- Location-based game
- Munzee
- Geocaching
- Wherigo
- LARP
- Escape Games
- Pokémon Go
- Puzzlehunt
