= Call of Duty: Mobile =

2019 video game

- Developer: TiMi Studio Group
- Publishers: Activision; Garena; VNG Games
- Writer: Brian Bloom
- Series: Call of Duty
- Engine: Unity
- Platforms: Android iOS 12 or later iPadOS; HarmonyOS; HarmonyOS Next; Windows
- Release: September 29, 2019; 7 years ago (Southeast Asia); October 1, 2019; 7 years ago (International); December 24, 2020; 5 years ago (Mainland China)
- Genres: First-person shooter Third-person shooter
- Modes: Multiplayer; Battle royale Zombies; DMZ: Recon

Call of Duty: Mobile is a 2019 multiplayer battle royale game developed by TiMi Studio Group and published by Activision for Android and iOS. Released as a free-to-play title as part of the Call of Duty video game series, it was one of the largest mobile game launches in history, generating over US$480 million with 270 million downloads within a year. Call of Duty: Mobile was published in other regions by Garena, Tencent Games, VNG Corporation and TiMi Studio Group.

== Gameplay ==
Gameplay of Call of Duty: Mobile. The game completely copies the previous "older" parts of its series (the picture shows the Crossfire map from the Modern Warfare subseries).

The game's two primary modes are multiplayer and battle royale. Players can choose to play ranked or non-ranked matches. Apart from standard matchmaking, a private room for both of these modes can also be accessed where players can invite and battle with their in-game friends. The game includes two types of in-game currencies: "Credits", which are earned through playing the game, and "COD Points", which are bought with real-world money. It is possible to play the full game without paying, though some exclusive character and weapon skins can only be bought with COD Points.

Additional modes include Zombies, which can be played in a more traditional "Endless" mode and in a new "Raid" mode where players survive for a fixed number of rounds and fight a boss afterward, and "DMZ: Recon", an adaptation of Call of Duty: Modern Warfare II's DMZ extraction mode, where players can fight against AI enemies and other players to extract loot and weapons for cosmetic rewards.

== Seasonal updates ==
Call of Duty: Mobile has a seasonal update system. New weapons, skins, maps, and limited-time events are added through the Battle Pass each season. Seasons also include special challenges and game modes that reward players with in-game items and experience points. This system helps keep players engaged and keeps the game fresh each season.

Characters, weapon skins, and events are all designed with a specific theme in mind for each season. These themes frequently show teamwork, futuristic details, or military environments. Each season has a similar identity because of the theme-based format. The Battle Pass is divided into free and premium tiers. Players can unlock rewards. Character skins and special decorations are examples of premium prizes. Seasonal updates often include limited-time events. Special objectives, changing game modes, and login rewards are frequently included in these events. Rewards are no longer available after the event finishes. Seasonal updates also include technical improvements and bug fixes. Developers can adjust weapon performance and game mechanics to maintain balance. These updates support the game's long-term development as a live service title.

=== Multiplayer ===
The multiplayer mode is a first-person shooter similar to previous Call of Duty games. The game also has 'Scorestreaks,' which are special weapons that become available as the player reaches certain point thresholds. The primary modes which the game features include Team Deathmatch, Frontline, Domination, Hardpoint, Search and Destroy, Control, Free For All, and Kill Confirmed. Additionally, the game features special and limited multiplayer modes that last for varying lengths of time. These include: Prop Hunt, Rapid Fire, Sticks and Stones, 2v2, Capture the Flag, One Shot One Kill, Snipers Only, Gun Game, and Attack of the Undead among others.

=== Battle Royale ===
The game also includes battle royale modes featuring up to 100 players. Players can choose to play solo, in a duo, or in a four-man squad. At the start of a match, all players choose an ability from healing to making a launch pad. Once all 100 players are ready, they board a transport plane that flies across the map in a randomized trajectory. This flight path changes every game. Every team is automatically given a jump leader who decides when and where the team will land. However, players can choose to break away and jump independently if they prefer.

Each player starts with a melee as their only weapon. Scattered across the map are various weapons, vehicles, and equipment that players can use to eliminate enemies and increase their chances of survival. The mode has high tier loot zones (marked in yellow on the map) that provide players with better items. The safe zone gradually shrinks as the match progresses, forcing players to move inward. Those who remain outside the zone for too long will take continuous damage and eventually be eliminated. The last surviving player or team wins the match. Battle royale also has limited modes like Battle Royale Isolated, Battle Royale Alcatraz, Battle Royale Blackout, Battle Royale Krai, and Battle Royale Blitz. The game also features a first-person shooter mode known as DMZ: Recon, which is an extraction based game mode (in effect as of 2025).

=== Additional Battle Royale Info ===
- Revive System: Some battle royale modes allow players to revive teammates if they collect their dog tags within a limited time.
- Airdrops: Supply drops periodically fall from the sky, containing rare weapons, armor, and perks.
- Classes: Players can choose from different character classes, such as Scout, Ninja, Medic, Defender, and more, each with unique abilities.
- Boss Fights: Some maps include AI-controlled bosses, such as the Butcher, which drop high-tier loot when defeated.
- Vehicles: The game features land, air, and water vehicles, such as ATVs, helicopters, and boats, which help players traverse the map quickly.
- Customization: Players can modify their loadouts with custom weapons, perks, and attachments before the match begins.

=== Zombies ===
A Zombies mode was added in November 2019. It featured one map called Shi No Numa. It placed teams of players against zombies that attacked in waves. It was playable in Endless Survival Mode, which ran like the classic Call of Duty: World at War experience, and Raid Mode, which threw a set number of waves at the players before transitioning to a boss encounter. The players could choose whether to play it on Normal or Heroic difficulty. The mode was removed in March 2020 due to it not reaching the desired level of quality. This mode was added back to the game in October 2022, again only featuring the Shi No Numa map.

Undead Siege, a zombie survival mode, was added into the game in August 2021. In it, a team of four players have to survive and protect their teleportation device from continuous waves of zombies. During the day, players have to collect supplies which are used during the night to survive against a horde of zombies. In addition, players during the day also take part in Daytime Side Missions, which include the Butcher, breaking the Aether Crystal Cluster, feeding 10 zombies to Cerberus and helping transport a big Aether Crystal. The mode has 3 difficulties - Casual, Hardcore and Nightmare. In casual, the team only has to survive for 3 nights while in other difficulties, the team has to survive for 5 nights.

== Development and release ==
Call of Duty: Mobile was announced in March 2019, with TiMi-J3, itself a TiMi Studio Group division, which is a subsidiary of Tencent Games, leading development. Many of the game's features were revealed at this announcement, promising a familiar experience for fans of the console game. The aim of the game was to take familiar aspects from the franchise's previous games and allow users to access them from their mobile devices. It features two in-game currencies, as well as a battle pass. The initial release was in Australia on June 15, 2019, following the soft-launches in Australia, Canada and Peru. Garena released the game in Hong Kong, Indonesia, Macau, Malaysia, Philippines, Singapore, Taiwan, and Thailand on September 29, 2019. The game was released in Europe, North America and Latin America by Activision on September 30, 2019, and by Tencent Games in South Korea on October 1, 2019. VNG Games released the game after the worldwide release in partnership with Activision and TiMi Studios in Vietnam on April 20, 2020. Tencent Games published the game for Mainland China on December 24, 2020.

Call of Duty: Mobile features many playable characters, maps, and game modes from previous games in the series. Different control settings were included to cater to player's preferences. A "zombies" game mode was added to the game in November 2019. This game mode followed the classic Call of Duty zombies "survival" formula where the player fights off endless waves of zombies, aiming to survive as long as possible. A "Raid" mode was also included where the player had to defeat a set amount of waves of zombies before encountering one of two final bosses.

== Esports ==
The Call of Duty: Mobile World Championship 2020 Tournament was a partnership between Activision Blizzard and Sony Mobile Communications, and marks the game's entry into the top tier of esports. It featured more than $1 million in total prizes, which include both cash and in-game cosmetics. Competing teams were drawn directly from the game's community through four open online qualifiers from April 20 to May 24, 2020. Eligible players ranked veteran or higher have the chance to play. The 2021 tournament featured a $2 million prize pool. In addition to the official Call of Duty: Mobile World Championship, third-party tournaments have emerged, providing additional competitive opportunities for players. Platforms such as Money Gaming host regular COD: Mobile Battle Royale events, allowing players of all skill levels to compete for real cash prizes.

== Reception ==
Reception

Aggregate score
Aggregator	Score
Metacritic	81/100

Review scores
Publication	Score
4Players	60/100
Destructoid	8.5/10
Eurogamer	8/10
GameSpot	8/10
Gamezebo	5/5
IGN	7.7/10
Jeuxvideo.com	16/20

Call of Duty: Mobile received "generally favorable reviews", according to the review aggregator Metacritic. IGN wrote that the game "represents the best the juggernaut franchise has ever been on a handheld platform. The leveling path is rewarding, even without spending money, and there are lots of modes to jump around between, including an impressive battle royale mode." GameSpot says "beyond its messy micro-transaction menus and the slight time-saving purchases, there's not much else in Call of Duty: Mobile that detracts from its faithful recreation of the exhilarating and fast-paced multiplayer action of the core series." Polygon also praised the game stating, "Call of Duty: Mobile doesn't come across like a deeply compromised or watered-down rendition of the age-old multiplayer format; it just feels like Call of Duty."

In the first month, the game had over 148 million downloads and generated nearly US$54 million in revenue, making it the largest mobile game launch in history. By June 2020, the game had generated over $327 million in revenue, and had seen over 250 million downloads. By October 2020, that figure had risen to over $480 million with 270 million downloads. As of February 2022, the game has generated over $1.5 billion globally in revenue from in-game spending and microtransactions, with the game having seen over 500 million downloads by May 2021. By November 2024, the game had amassed more than $3 billion in revenue, with the game having achieved over 1 billion downloads.

=== Accolades ===
Year	Award	Category	Result	Ref.
2019	Hollywood Music in Media Awards	Song/Score - Mobile Video Game	Nominated	
2019	The Game Awards 2019	Best Mobile Game	Won	
2020	23rd Annual D.I.C.E. Awards	Portable Game of the Year	Nominated	
2020	Game Developers Choice Awards	Best Mobile Game	Nominated	
2020	SXSW Gaming Awards	Mobile Game of the Year	Nominated	
2020	16th British Academy Games Awards	Mobile Game of the Year	Won	
2020	The Game Awards 2020	Best Mobile Game	Nominated	
2025	Golden Joystick Awards	Still Playing Award - Mobile	Nominated	
