= Reality hacker =

Reality hacker, reality cracker or reality coder may refer to:

- Reality hacking, any phenomenon that emerges from the nonviolent use of illegal or legally ambiguous digital tools in pursuit of politically, socially, or culturally subversive ends.
- Reality Hacker, a character class in the game Realmwalkers: Earth Light by Mind's Eye Publishing.
- Reality Hackers, an earlier name for Mondo 2000 magazine.
- Reality Coders, a faction of the Virtual Adepts, a secret society of mages whose magick revolves around digital technology, in the Mage: The Ascension role-playing game.

== See also ==
- Life hack
- Urban Exploration
- Hacktivism
- Pervasive game
