= Locative media =

Media of communication functionally bound to a location

- Other names: Location-based media
- Field: Communication studies, New media, Pervasive computing
- Origin: Karlis Kalnins, 2003

Locative media or location-based media (LBM) is a virtual medium of communication functionally bound to a location. The physical implementation of locative media, however, is not bound to the same location to which the content refers.

Location-based media delivers multimedia and other content directly to the user of a mobile device dependent upon their location. Location information determined by means such as mobile phone tracking and other emerging real-time locating system technologies like Wi-Fi or RFID can be used to customize media content presented on the device.

Locative media are digital media applied to real places and thus triggering real social interactions. While mobile technologies such as the Global Positioning System (GPS), laptop computers and mobile phones enable locative media, they are not the goal for the development of projects in this field.

== Description ==
Media content is managed and organized externally of the device on a standard desktop, laptop, server, or cloud computing system. The device then downloads this formatted content with GPS or other RTLS coordinate-based triggers applied to each media sequence. As the location-aware device enters the selected area, centralized services trigger the assigned media, designed to be of optimal relevance to the user and their surroundings.

Use of locative technologies "includes a range of experimental uses of geo-technologies including location-based games, artistic critique of surveillance technologies, experiential mapping, and spatial annotation." Location based media allows for the enhancement of any given environment offering explanation, analysis and detailed commentary on what the user is looking at through a combination of video, audio, images and text. The location-aware device can deliver interpretation of cities, parklands, heritage sites, sporting events or any other environment where location based media is required.

The content production and pre-production are integral to the overall experience that is created and must have been performed with ultimate consideration of the location and the users position within that location. The media offers a depth to the environment beyond that which is immediately apparent, allowing revelations about background, history and current topical feeds.

== Locative, ubiquitous and pervasive computing ==
The term 'locative media' was coined by Karlis Kalnins. Locative media is closely related to augmented reality (reality overlaid with virtual reality) and pervasive computing (computers everywhere, as in ubiquitous computing). Whereas augmented reality strives for technical solutions, and pervasive computing is interested in embedded computers, locative media concentrates on social interaction with a place and with technology. Many locative media projects have a social, critical or personal (memory) background.

While strictly spoken, any kind of link to additional information set up in space (together with the information that a specific place supplies) would make up location-dependent media, the term locative media is strictly bound to technical projects. Locative media works on locations and yet many of its applications are still location-independent in a technical sense. As in the case of digital media, where the medium itself is not digital but the content is digital, in locative media the medium itself might not be location-oriented, whereas the content is location-oriented.

Japanese mobile phone culture embraces location-dependent information and context-awareness. It is projected that in the near future locative media will develop to a significant factor in everyday life.

== Enabling technologies ==
Locative media projects use technology such as Global Positioning System (GPS), laptop computers, the mobile phone, Geographic Information System (GIS), and web map services such as Mapbox, OpenStreetMap, and Google Maps among others. Whereas GPS allows for the accurate detection of a specific location, mobile computers allow interactive media to be linked to this place. The GIS supplies arbitrary information about the geological, strategic or economic situation of a location. Web maps like Google Maps give a visual representation of a specific place. Another important new technology that links digital data to a specific place is radio-frequency identification (RFID), a successor to barcodes like Semacode.

Research that contributes to the field of locative media happens in fields such as pervasive computing, context awareness and mobile technology. The technological background of locative media is sometimes referred to as "location-aware computing".

== Creative representation ==
Place is often seen as central to creativity; in fact, "for some—regional artists, citizen journalists and environmental organizations for example—a sense of place is a particularly important aspect of representation, and the starting point of conversations." Locative media can propel such conversations in its function as a "poetic form of data visualization," as its output often traces how people move in, and by proxy, make sense of, urban environments.

Given the dynamism and hybridity of cities and the networks which comprise them, locative media extends the internet landscape to physical environments where people forge social relations and actions which can be "mobile, plural, differentiated, adventurous, innovative, but also estranged, alienated, impersonalized." Moreover, in using locative technologies, users can expand how they communicate and assert themselves in their environment and, in doing so, explore this continuum of urban interactions. Furthermore, users can assume a more active role in constructing the environments they are situated in accordingly.

Design scholars Anne Galloway and Matthew Ward state that "various online lists of pervasive computing and locative media projects draw out the breadth of current classification schema: everything from mobile games, place-based storytelling, spatial annotation and networked performances to device-specific applications."

A prominent creative use of locative media is in locative media art. A sub-category of interactive art or new media art, locative media art explores the relationships between the real world and the virtual or between people, places or objects in the real world. Particularly prevalent in the early-to-mid 2000s, locative media art often used GPS, text messaging, personal digital assistants and the early mobile web to make works tied to specific places in public space, drawing on psychogeography and the Situationist International. Writers distinguished two broad approaches: annotative works, which let people tag places with text, sound or images, and phenomenological or tracing works, which recorded the movement of people through the city. Although artists worked internationally, the movement was closely associated with a community in New York centered on the Glowlab collective and the Conflux festival. The field's distinctiveness faded after the 2008 iPhone 3G made GPS a standard consumer feature and location-awareness became ordinary.

== Examples ==
Notable locative media projects include Bio Mapping by Christian Nold in 2004, locative art projects such as Yellow Arrow and Britglyph, and location-based games such as AR Quake by the Wearable Computer Lab at the University of South Australia and Can You See Me Now? in 2001 by Blast Theory in collaboration with the Mixed Reality Lab at the University of Nottingham. In 2005, the Silicon Valley–based collaborators of C5 first exhibited the C5 Landscape Initiative, a suite of four GPS inspired projects that investigate perception of landscape in light of locative media.

In William Gibson's 2007 novel Spook Country, locative art is one of the main themes and set pieces in the story. Narrative projects which engage with locative media are sometimes referred to as Location-Aware Fiction, as explored in "Data and Narrative: Location Aware Fiction" a 2003 essay by Kate Armstrong. This location-aware fiction is also known as locative literature, where locative stories and poems can be experienced via digital portals, apps, QR codes and e-books, as well as via analogue forms such as labelling tape, Scrabble tiles, fridge magnets or Post-It notes, and these are forms often used by the writer and artist Matt Blackwood.

The Transborder Immigrant Tool by the Electronic Disturbance Theater is a locative media project aimed at providing life saving directions to water for people trying to cross the US / Mexico border. The project attracted global media attention in 2009 and 2010. Articles included a Los Angeles Times cover story focusing on Ricardo Dominguez and an AP story interviewing Micha Cárdenas and Brett Stalbaum. The articles focused on concerns over the legality of the project and the ensuing investigations of the group, which are still underway. The Transborder Immigrant Tool has recently been included in a number of major exhibitions including Here, Not There at the Museum of Contemporary Art San Diego and the 2010 California Biennial at the Orange County Museum of Art.

Invisible Threads by Stephanie Rothenberg and Jeff Crouse is a locative media project aimed at creating embodied awareness of sweatshops and just-in-time production through a virtual sweatshop in Second Life. It was performed at the Sundance Film Festival in 2008.

The first mobile game to combine both location-based data with augmented reality was Paranormal Activity: Sanctuary, published by Ogmento in February 2011. Inspired by the hit film franchise, the game offered a unique setting where the player’s home town, office or neighborhood became the front lines of a supernatural conflict.

The application called Yesterscape was released for iPhone by Japanese company QOOQ inc. in 2013. This augmented reality camera App which can show historical photo of the space as if user look into the time tunnel. QOOQ inc also offers user to add their historical photos via web interface for them to show through Yesterscape.

In December 2022, virtual band Gorillaz teamed up with Nexus Studios to create the "Gorillaz Presents" app to enable users to use Google's ARCore Geospatial API to watch a virtual performance of the band's song, "Skinny Ape" at Times Square, New York and Piccadilly Circus, London.

== See also ==
- Location-based service
- Location-based game
- Mobile media
- Soundmap
- Spatial contextual awareness
- Urban informatics
- Virtual graffiti
- Location-based software (category)
