= Pervasive game =

Video game extending to the real world

A pervasive game is one where the gaming experience is extended out into the real world, or where the fictional world in which the game takes place blends with the physical world. The "It's Alive" mobile games company described pervasive games as "games that surround you", while Montola, Stenros, and Waern's book Pervasive Games defines them as having "one or more salient features that expand the contractual magic circle of play spatially, temporally, or socially". The concept of a "magic circle" draws from the work of Johan Huizinga, who describes the boundaries of play.

The origins of pervasive gaming are related to the concepts of pervasive computing, ubiquitous computing, and ubiquitous gaming.

== Definitions ==
The first definition of a pervasive game was as "a LARP (Live action role-playing game) game that is augmented with computing and communication technology in a way that combines the physical and digital space together". Since then the term has become ambiguous, taking on multiple definitions, from using "non standard input devices" to a game that "blends with everyday experiences".

These definitions can be generalized as being from two perspectives: "a technological one that focuses on computing technology as a tool to enable the game to come into being" (i.e., the first two meanings on the list above) and "a cultural one that focuses on the game itself and, subsequently, on the way the game world can be related to the everyday world" (i.e., the eight remaining meanings above). In definitive work by Markus Montola, pervasive games are summarily defined as having "one or more salient features that expand the contractual magic circle of play spatially, temporally, or socially", in other words "expand the boundaries of play".

From the user experience perspective, Arango-López et al. propose a new definition, taking into account the given basis by Montola and their own experience in the game's development. They define that: "A pervasive game delivers to the player an enriched experience of the game through an evolvement of the dynamics of the game, expanding the space of the game according to the context where it is played. This allows breaking the boundaries of the game world, making reality part of it and that the elements in that really have an influence during the game". They delved in the special features and added a component diagram of the pervasive games, it is based on the pervasive narrative of videogames.

== History ==
The first time the word "pervasive" was applied to gaming is around March or April 2001, by Jennica Falk, in an article referring to the environment of the game, rather than the game itself. That same year Jay Schneider and Gerd Kortuem coined the term "pervasive gaming", admitting that they derived the term from pervasive computing. Although the origins of ubiquitous computing and pervasive computing differ, they are often used interchangeably and both are the basis for pervasive gaming. Specifically, it is the technological perspective of pervasive games that borrows from both the cultural and the technological perspectives of pervasive computing. And, because ubiquitous computing and pervasive computing have been intermingled in the past, they both influence pervasive games.

At the Computer Science Lab at Xerox PARC in 1988, Mark Weiser set up a "ubiquitous computing" research program to "conceive a new way of thinking about computers in the world, one that takes into account the natural human environment and allows the computers themselves to vanish into the background". The program was designed such that computers were to cater to the wishes of the user, being of various sizes, aware of their location and easy to use. In 1998, Mark Bregman at IBM introduced "pervasive computing" as a commercial aspect where people have quick access to services anytime and anywhere. Initially, the concepts of ubiquitous computing and pervasive computing were from different perspectives, but the two concepts were continuously redefined and related to other terms and concepts, leading to confusion and ambiguity.

== Staging a pervasive game ==
The staging of a pervasive game can be divided into three temporal phases: "pre-production", "run-time", and "post-production", but because we are dealing with games these phases can also be referred to as "pre-game", "in-game" and "post-game", leaving the word "run-time" to mean that the game is running, but players are not necessarily playing. Because pervasive games make use of technology, the technology is started during or at the end of the pre-game phase and left running throughout the in-game phase. The pre-game phase is usually used to reconfigure or author the game to a particular context, for example a location. Reconfiguration of the game can extend into the in-game phase. The post-game phase is often used to debrief players and perform analysis of the game for further stagings.

While players are playing in the in-game phase, the game can be continuously altered through the use of game mastering. Because pervasive games take place in the physical world, another responsibility of the game master is to keep players safe in the highly variable, possibly dangerous conditions of the physical world. A drawback of game mastering being that it can require a significant amount of human resources. In order to support game mastering, tools can be used to automate the process. Such tools, among other things, can help process the potentially massive amounts of event information game masters must deal with. Two ways a gamemaster can influence the flow of the game: by directly altering information in the technology guiding the game, or by communicating directly with the players.

== Classification ==
Pervasive games have been associated with ubiquitous games, augmented and mixed reality games, mobile games, alternate reality games, (enhanced) live action role playing, affective gaming, virtual reality games, smart toys, location-based or location-aware games, crossmedia games and augmented tabletop games. The book Digital Cityscapes categorizes "playful activities that use mobile technologies as interfaces and the physical space as the game board" into four categories; pervasive games is said to be the most general, with urban games, location-based mobile games and hybrid reality games being successively more specific.

Another subclassification of pervasive games is based on to what degree technology is utilized in the game. A pervasive game is said to be "technology-sustained", if the game relies on computer simulation, in other words, "the computer maintains the game state through monitoring and reacting to player activities". In contrast, "technology-supported" pervasive games use technology, but it is not required for all game activities. Hybrids are possible, where part of the game is technology-sustained, but others are not.

Not a straightforward classification, Valente et al. propose a method to determine pervasive qualities applicable to mobile games, i.e. what makes a mobile game pervasive? The results of their method is a quality report containing a Quality spreadsheet and a Quality vector summarizing each game. They provide a taxonomy of pervasive qualities consisting of the following first-level qualities: Spatiality, Permanence, Communicability, Accessibility, Context awareness, Resilience and Sociality. Each of these first-level qualities has been divided into one or more second-level qualities.

== Examples ==
Examples of pervasive games include Pokémon Go, Négone, The Killer, The Beast, Shelby Logan's Run, BotFighters, Pac-Manhattan, Uncle Roy All Around You, Amazing Race.

Pervasive game examples built on the EQUIP 2 software architecture, used in Equator and thereafter in IPerG, include Can You See Me Now?, Rider Spoke, Day of the Figurines, and Love City. Niantic, Inc. launched Ingress in 2012, with about 500,000 players globally, and Pokémon Go in 2016. Another popular pervasive game is Haunted Candy Hunt, an AR mobile game inspired by Ghostbusters and developed by Trigger.

== See also ==
- Augmented reality
- Blast Theory
- Pervasive informatics
- The Game (mind game)
- Transreality gaming
