= Let's Hunt Monsters =

- Developer: TiMi Studio Group
- Publisher: Tencent Games
- Platforms: iOS, Android
- Release: CHN: 11 April 2019
- Genre: Location-based game

Let's Hunt Monsters
- Traditional Chinese: 一起來捉妖
- Simplified Chinese: 一起来捉妖
- Literal meaning: together catch monsters
Transcriptions
Standard Mandarin
- Hanyu Pinyin: yīqǐ lái zhuō yāo

Let's Hunt Monsters (Chinese: 一起来捉妖) is a 2019 geolocation-based mobile game developed by TiMi Studio Group and published in China by Tencent. The game has an augmented reality mode, similar to other contemporaneous geolocation-based games. Let's Hunt Monsters has often been labelled a clone of Pokémon Go due to similarities. The game is centered around catching digital creatures based on Chinese mythology.

== Gameplay ==
Let's Hunt Monsters is based on the player's location in the real world, and the game is centered around moving to find and catch in-game creatures, which are based on entities from Chinese mythology. In order to catch the creatures, players use "spirit orbs" that can be tossed onto the creatures. The spirit orbs themselves are obtainable from "Prayer Drums", derived from real-world locations. The game also contains gameplay elements inspired by massively multiplayer online games, such as "bases" for "guilds" where players can build structures. As of April 2019, there were 302 obtainable creatures.

The game allows players to trade digital "kittens" through Tencent's blockchain platform, a feature which has been compared to CryptoKitties.

== Development ==
Tencent Games announced Let's Hunt Monsters on 23 April 2018, and included in the announcement that the game would enter testing in Chengdu in early May of that year. It was released for the Chinese App Stores on 11 April 2019.

== Reception ==
The game has been widely labelled as a clone of Pokémon Go, which was released globally three years earlier, but is not available in China. Abacus News wrote that Pokémon Go and Let's Hunt Monsters "look almost exactly the same", citing similarities in features, mechanics, art style, and user interface. Let's Hunt Monsters was China's most-downloaded game on the country's iOS App Store in the month of its release. Sensor Tower estimated that the game had earned more than US$50 million from iOS alone in September 2019, making it at that time the second-highest grossing location-based AR game behind Pokémon Go, which had earned over 25 times as much globally on iOS.
