= Turf (video game) =

2010 video game

- Developer: Andrimon
- Directors: Andreas Pantesjö; Simon Sikström
- Platforms: Android, iOS
- Release: 10 July 2010
- Genres: massively multiplayer online, location based game

Turf is a location-based mobile game with MMO elements developed by Swedish video game developer Andrimon. It was released on 10 July 2010 for Android, and later for iOS. The game was originally created by Andreas Pantesjö and Simon Sikström, who still actively maintain and develop the game. The game has around 315,000 registered players (as of April 2021) and is free to play. Players can pay a voluntary fee to receive "supporter" status, which gives access to additional in-app statistics, but comes with no gameplay benefits. The game has received media attention from Swedish, Finnish, Danish and British newspapers and media.

== Gameplay ==
Turf combines elements from traditional orienteering with elements commonly seen in many video games, such as a leveling system, leaderboards and achievements. The goal is to collect points by capturing virtual zones using the built-in GPS system of modern smartphones, and try to keep them for as long as possible to compete with other players. Zones are located all over the world, but with the highest concentration in countries with active competition, such as Sweden, Finland, Denmark, Norway and Great Britain. Zones are most commonly taken by foot or by bicycle, but occasionally zones are captured by other means, such as by boat and by car. Turf is used by many players as an exergame, a way of combining exercise with gaming. It has also been compared with augmented reality games Ingress and Pokémon Go.

Players can earn achievements called Medals, gain ranks that are kept between game rounds, and play with a league-style leaderboard.

=== Game rounds ===
Turf is played in rounds that each last for about a month. Collected points by the player reset when a new round starts, as well as all ownership of the zones in the game. Total accumulated points by the player never reset after a round ends, as these are used to determine a player's rank as well as provide useful statistics for players to track their progress. At the end of a round the winner may choose to create a unique, custom zone anywhere.

== Events ==
There are special events arranged when players gather in a city to compete. A major annual event is called a ”Bonanza”, where participants gather in a city and run a standalone game session that lasts for a few hours. Bonanzas are characterized by dense placement of zones in a game environment separate from the regular game to make the contest a standalone championship. The first Bonanza organized for Djurgården in Stockholm, Sweden, on 21 May 2011. In 2016, it was held in Kalmar. In both 2012 and 2018, it was held in Västerås, Sweden.

Other, smaller, events also occur that are similar to the major annual Bonanza event. They can be situated in different places with different orientations (canoe, only by foot, long seclusion etc.) On 19 June 2011, one of the first Turf events was at Dreamhack in Sweden.

An event can also be a closed event where only the invited have access, with small groups such as school physical education. In 2016, more than 300 physical education lessons consisted of "orientation" with Turf.
