= Ulrike and Eamon Compliant =

Ulrike and Eamon Compliant is a work by Blast Theory that premiered at the 53rd Venice Biennale in June 2009, commissioned by the De La Warr Pavilion and supported by Arts Council England.

The work is based on the lives of Ulrike Meinhof (Red Army Faction) and Eamon Collins (Irish Republican Army). Having chosen to be Eamon or Ulrike, participants walk through the city receiving mobile phone calls. Exploring subjectivities and political obligations, the work culminates in an interview with the artists in a hidden room.

Mixing locative media, live performance, and interactivity, the work counterpoints the context of Venice with Berlin in the 1970s and Northern Ireland in the 1980s.

A book with a foreword by Alan Haydon, Director of the De La Warr Pavilion, featuring an essay by Richard Grayson (artist), was first published in November 2009.

Ulrike and Eamon Compliant won "Best Real-World Game" at the 2010 International Mobile Gaming Awards on 15 February at Mobile World Congress in Barcelona.
