= Maguss =

2018 video game

- Developer: Mawa
- Publisher: Mawa
- Engine: Unity
- Platforms: iOS, Android
- Release: WW: February 2018
- Genres: Location-based game, Augmented Reality, MMORPG, Exergame
- Modes: Single-player, multiplayer

Maguss was a free-to-play location-based mobile MMORPG with a fantasy theme for iOS and Android. The game offered players a wizarding experience, allowing them to cast spells by drawing glyphs, collect ingredients, brew various potions, battle magical creatures, and duel other players for glory and treasure. The game's shutdown was announced in April 2020.

== Gameplay ==
Using a mobile device's GPS function and augmented reality technology, Maguss brings a wizard's world to life by populating real locations with beasts and magical creatures to fight, ingredients to gather, and treasure chests to unlock. Players choose from one of four classes (Paladin, Rogue, Druid, or Warden), each with its own blend of starting attributes, spells, strengths, and weaknesses. Players also customize an avatar to represent their character. Characters possess an array of skills (Brewing, Exploration, Herblore, Sorcery, Invocation, Charms, and Dark Arts) that they can raise by accomplishing related activities. For example, collecting and opening a chest raises Exploration, while casting Sorcery spells raises the Sorcery skill. By exploring the world map, players may encounter monsters, harvest ingredients, and discover treasure. They can also replenish their health by walking from one location to another. Players raise their overall Player Level from defeating opponents—monsters or other players. As they advance in level, they can raise their attributes and gain access to various tiered equipment and wandering monster encounters.

=== Spellcasting ===
Spellcasting in Maguss allows players to engage monsters (and each other) in arcane combat. Casting spells involves unlocking them, assigning them to glyphs, practicing their use, and applying them in duels. Spells fall under four categories: Sorcery (direct damage), Charms (healing and buffs), Invocations (defense), and Dark Arts (damage while also debuffing enemies). Players unlock additional spells as they gain experience in a particular spell category. Players have access to a set of glyphs which function as slots for spells. To ready a spell, the player must first assign it to a specific glyph. In combat, they have to draw the corresponding glyph within a given time limit to cast the spell it contains. This adds an element of skill to casting, as one needs to trace glyphs both quickly and correctly to unleash their effects.

=== Dueling ===
In Maguss, players may challenge monsters or other players in a combat. Duels are semi-turned based: each combat cycle, both participants cast spells during the allotted time, after which the spell effects are resolved one at a time, in a sequence alternating between the player and the enemy. The winner is awarded gold and experience points. Another game mechanic to duels is Heat, indicated by a meter and representing a wizard's stamina for spellcasting. The more powerful a spell, the more Heat it generates when used. Once a player overheats, they cannot cast a spell until they cool off again. The game offers 2 PvP modes: Proximity Mode, where players may duel nearby wizards, or a Ranked League through a global matchmaking system. Ranked Leagues run for 30-day long seasons, each with their own unique theme. For each Ranked League win, players earn Competitive Points which they can exchange for that season's unique armour illusions. Based on their final rank at the end of the season, players gain various rewards consisting of Competitive Points, League Badges, and Season icons.

=== Brewing ===
Another activity players may partake in is potion-making. By using recipes, player may collect the ingredients to use in a potion brewing mini-game, the results of which determines the drink's effectiveness. Potions may have a multitude of effects, ranging from healing to buffing stats. More advanced recipes become available as the player improves their Brewing Skill.

=== Equipment ===
Players may collect a variety of equipment: wands, headgear, tops, bottoms, rings, amulets, and books. Each piece of gear can boost stats or provide a unique benefit, such as giving bonus gold or experience points upon winning duels. These boosts depend on the item's tier as well as its quality (Poor, Good, Mint, Excellent, Legendary). Besides regular equipment, players can also wear armour illusions. These can be worn over equipment, allowing players to alter their look while maintaining their current gear.

=== Monetization ===
The monetization model consists of in-app purchases and optional rewarded ads. The game includes 2 currencies: Gold (soft currency) and Magic Dust (premium currency). While some items (potions and recipes) can be purchased for both currencies others (equipment, spells) are only available for gold. Luxuries, such as cosmetics (armor illusions, alternate spell effects), ingredient and magical creature packs and boosters are only available for premium currency. All ads are optional and rewarding. Watching an ad can speed up brewing time, prolong booster for a little bit more or earn Bazaar tokens. In Bazaar (a special shop category) players can exchange Bazaar tokens earned from watching ads for premium items such as armor illusions, boosters or even Magic Dust.

== Development ==
=== History ===
Ondrej Tokar first conceived of Maguss in July 2014, and later formed the Software Company Mawa s.r.o., a remote indie team based in Central Europe. By June 2015, the team had a prototype of a Maguss Wand ready for a kickstarter campaign, which launched a month later. On October 10, 2017, Maguss launched on Indiegogo, eventually reaching 214% of targeted funding within 30 days. Game testing followed until November 10. December 2017 saw the end of the IndieGogo campaign and the launch of the closed alpha iteration. Maguss was set for a soft beta launch in February 2018, to last until December 2018.

=== Maguss Wand ===
Part of Maguss's development was plans for the creation of a device that mimicked a magic wand. The Maguss Wand was to provide an immersive approach to spellcasting—instead of drawing glyphs on their mobile device, players would be able to trace them in the air instead. The prototype designs of the Maguss Wand showed a 350mm long plastic body with a single button and micro USB port for charging, compatible with Android (version 4.1 Jellybean and newer) and iOS (version 7), and tethering to mobile devices using BLE (Bluetooth Low Energy). The wand would offer customization by replacing the grip, tip, and metal rings. However, the wand was never produced beyond prototypes that were not distributed to users, nor were crowdfunding contributions ever directly refunded, though compensation was offered in the form of in-game credit.

=== Shutdown ===
The game's developers announced on Facebook on April 6, 2020, that they would be permanently shutting down the game down due to insufficient income.

== Awards ==
In December 2016, Maguss won the Slovak Startup Awards in the Art and Design category. In March 2017, Maguss also received the Slovak Forbes 30 under 30 Award. It has also received mentions in CNET, Engadget, Nerdmuch, and other media.

== See also ==
- List of geolocation-based video games
