= Virtual graffiti =

Graffiti only visible through augmented reality software

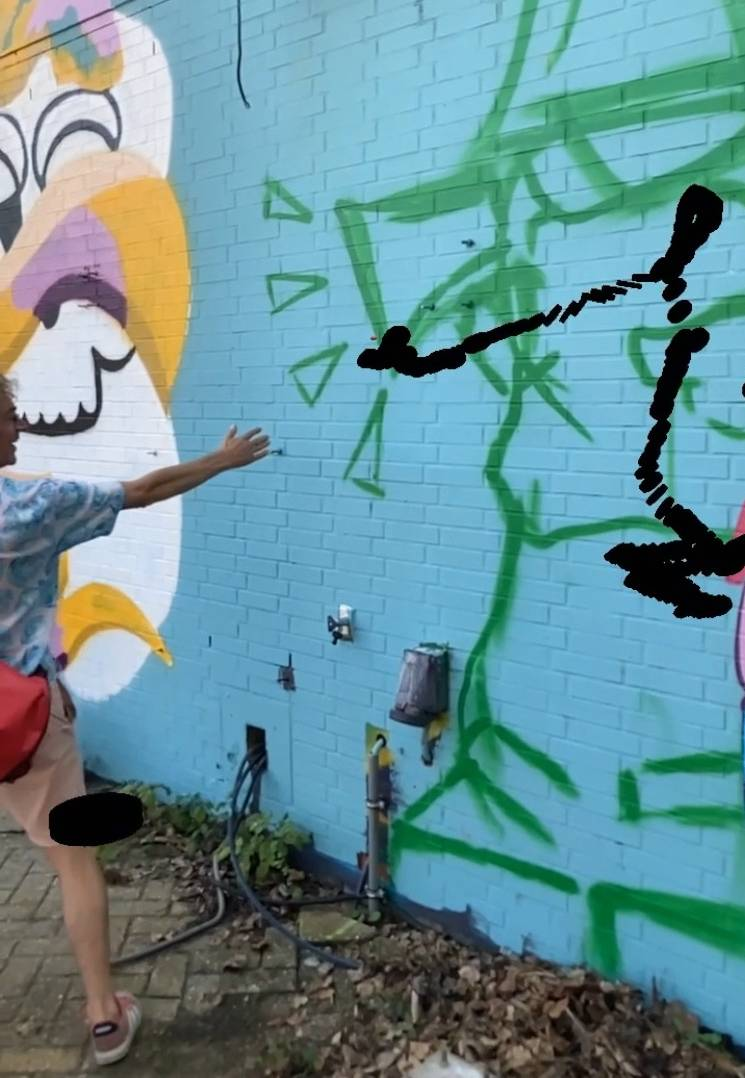
A person "spraying" virtual graffiti onto a physical wall, as see through an augmented reality interface: the black marks on the wall are only visible in a virtual reality view of the scene

Virtual graffiti consists of virtual or digital media applied to public locations, landmarks or surfaces. Virtual graffiti applications utilize augmented reality and ubiquitous computing to anchor virtual graffiti to physical landmarks or objects in the real world. The virtual content can then be viewed through digital devices. Virtual graffiti is aimed at delivering messaging and social multimedia content to mobile applications and devices based on the identity, location, and community of the user.

== Mediums ==
This overall effort focuses on creating new mobile experiences based on merging virtual reality, telepresence, and GPS. These experiences evolve over time based on the needs and capabilities of the users.

=== Location-based messaging ===
This medium regards a mobile user receiving or sending a message based on their location. The content quality is directly related to the accuracy of the user's location. These include experiences such as:

- Searching where the nearest restaurant is and receiving a set of messages and coupons from nearby restaurant proprietors.
- Receiving a message on their mobile device that there is traffic ahead with a suggested alternative route.
- Coworkers receive a notification that an upcoming meeting has been moved to a new location.

=== Location anchored virtual reality ===
This involves anchoring a virtual reality experience at a physical location. Thus the experiences in the virtual world can only be had at a specific real location. Several use cases that are included here are:

- A virtual command post can be set up at the scene of an incident. This command post involves the sharing of information in the virtual world but can only be accessed by those at the scene of the incident.
- A set of blogs and media files are left at famous outdoor sculptures. Groups of friends can contribute, copy, and share files only while they are viewing the sculpture.

== Background ==
The phrase "virtual graffiti" has existed for a long time and has been applied to various applications over the years. Originally, it referred to posting messages on electronic bulletin board systems. From there, it has developed in academia into contextual messaging applications.

=== Contextual messaging ===
Contextual messaging refers to leaving some type of context-specific annotation, e.g., a virtual Post-it Note on a computer monitor, a time-sensitive message attached to a wall, or location-based graffiti on a physical object.

Researchers at the University of Salford experimented with a Cave system in which a user could mark up a scene using 6-degree freedom sensors. Obviously, this is not suitable for immediate use or mass market applications, but it serves as starting point from which other work could be derived.

During a research fellowship at the University of Georgia in 2003, Kit Hughes developed a system in which users with WiFi-enabled mobile devices could mark up buildings in downtown Athens, Georgia, with their own virtual graffiti via a process known as tagging. In this system, the buildings are selected on a map, and the graffiti is stored in a database that can be accessed from other mobile devices and the project’s website.

A location-based messaging system for leaving virtual post-it notes on physical objects was developed at the National University of Singapore. The system uses mobile devices as Augmented Reality interfaces to view virtual messages associated with fiducial markers on physical objects.

In a project from Lancaster University, mobile phones are used as digital mediums, using RFID tags to identify markable objects. The RFID tags can hold the identities of the last five people to leave graffiti. The graffiti itself is stored on a server. When another user comes within range of an RFID-tagged object, the associated graffiti is downloaded onto their mobile device.

== See also ==
- WallaMe
- Locative media
- Location-based game
- GPS
- Urban exploring
