= Shadow Cities =

2010 video game

- Developer: Grey Area
- Publisher: Grey Area
- Platform: iPhone
- Release: WW: 2010
- Genre: Location-based mobile game
- Modes: Single-player, multiplayer

Shadow Cities was an early location-based mobile game, created by the Finnish company Grey Area. The game took place in a "parallel world", using the player's physical GPS location on an in-game map, battling other nearby players. The game was exclusively available for iPhone devices.

Development started in 2008, only a year after the first iPhone was released, with $2.5 million of venture capital funding. The game was initially launched on 10 November 2010 in Finland, expanding to North America and 13 European countries in 2011. However, Grey Area shut down the game on 7 October 2013.

== See also ==
- Ingress
