= Day of the Figurines =

Massively multiplayer online game

Day of the Figurines is a pervasive game by Blast Theory that was built on the EQUIP architecture.

== Description ==
Day Of The Figurines is a massively multiplayer online game (MMOG) for text messaging, set in a fictional town. The events in the town start as normal; over the next 24-hours in real time, things become more violent as invading soldiers enter the town, and players must decide how they will help others, and how they themselves will survive.

The project was funded by the European Commission's IST Programme. It was first tested in the spring and summer of 2005. It was produced in collaboration with Nottingham University's Mixed Reality Lab and Sony Net Services.

The unique game/performance piece was analyzed in several academic journals and papers:

- "Temporal Expansion in Blast Theory's "Day of the Figurines"", PAJ: A Journal of Performance and Art (2008)
- "From interaction to trajectories: Designing coherent journeys through user experiences", ResearchGate (2009)
- "Day of the Figurines", Performance Research: A Journal of the Performing Arts (2011)
