= WallaMe =

Augmented reality app

Wallame
- Developer: Wallame Ltd.
- Release: 2015; 11 years ago
- Operating system: iOS 7.0 or later; Android 4.1 or later
- Available in: English, Italian, German, Spanish
- Type: Photo and video
- Website: walla.me

WallaMe is a free iOS and Android app that allows users to hide and share messages in the real world using augmented reality.

Users can take a picture of a surface around them and write, draw and add stickers and photos on them. Once the message (called Wall) is completed, it will be geolocalized and will remain visible through WallaMe's AR viewer by everyone passing by. A Wall can also be made private, thus becoming visible only to specific people.

All the Walls created worldwide can be seen in a feed similar to those of social networks like Facebook and Instagram, and can be liked, commented on, and shared outside the app.

WallaMe is mostly used to create digital graffiti and for proximity messaging.

== Developers ==
WallaMe is developed by WallaMe Ltd., a startup company founded in 2015 in London. Venturebeat cited WallaMe Ltd. in a list of 100 noteworthy young startups.

== Awards ==
WallaMe was featured in the Product Hunt home page.

== See also ==
- Virtual graffiti
