= Yuan Meng Star =

- Developer: TiMi Studio Group
- Publisher: CN: Tencent Games
- Platforms: Android, iOS
- Release: CN: December 15, 2023
- Genres: Battle royale; platform; party
- Modes: Single player, multiplayer

Yuan Meng Star (Chinese: 元梦之星; pinyin: Yuán Mèng Zhīxīn, tentatively translated for an international audience as DreamStar) is a casual mobile video game developed by TiMi Studio Group and released by Tencent Games for Android and iOS in China on December 15, 2023. Within one month after the game was released, there were more than 80 million registered players, and the total number of user-generated maps created by players reached tens of millions.
