= Xuan Dou Zhi Wang =

In-development online PC fighting game

- Promotional picture
- Developer: Jade Studio (now as TiMi Studio Group)
- Publisher: Tencent Games
- Platform: Microsoft Windows
- Genre: Fighting
- Mode: Single-player

Xuan Dou Zhi Wang (炫斗之王, "The King of Dazzling Fighters", tentatively translated for an international audience as King of Combat) was an in-development online PC fighting game by Jade Studio for Tencent Games. The game's first Beta build was available since 2011 in China via digital download. Game's development was paused since 2014. A beat' em up spin-off titled Tian Tian Xuan Dou (international name Fantasy Fighter) was released in 2014.

== Gameplay ==
Example of a fight.

The gameplay is similar to games like The King of Fighters '97 and The King of Fighters '98. It consisted of the same 4-buttons layout, including the ability to perform short and super jumps, rolls and strong attacks ("blowbacks"); throws were performed by pushing the two punch buttons together, however. A maximum of 3 Super gauge levels were attainable. Pushing light kick and heavy punch together put the characters in MAX mode, where their damage increased and gained the ability to perform an improved version of a super move.

Single and team battles (3 vs. 3 fighters; either six players, each one of them controlling a fighter, or two players, each one controlling three) in the King of Fighters fashion were available.

=== Online features ===
While the game was downloaded and installed in the PC, it couldn't run without the computer being connected to the internet, in order to connect with the Tencent servers. Ranked single battles and the option to create rooms to sustain matches were possible, as well as single player modes including a 1-player arcade mode, bonus stages of breaking barrels (similar to Street Fighter II), and an adventure mode resembling a beat 'em up game.

There were "missions" to complete every day (for example, beating arcade mode once or sustaining 5 team battles) that granted experience points and "Point coupons", used to rent or buy characters and costumes in the game's store ("Shop"). Users won experience to unlock new fighters, and they could train each one of their characters to upgrade their skills, with characters unlocking a powerful "Hidden" super move upon reaching level 30. Updates with new characters, costumes and game modes were added every 1 or 2 months, as well as balance patches with changes to the characters' moves and their properties.

== Plot ==
In the year 20XX, a meteor called The Messiah landed in Peru, carrying with it mysterious "CORE crystals", containing a microscopic form of life called "The EVA". United Nations formed a group of scientists called the CRD ("CORE Research and Development") in order to obtain and investigate the properties of the CORE. The CORE is a life form in the middle of a virus and a compound, and it can bond to living hosts. The first contact with the scientists ("First Baptism") was lethal, but after discovering the CORE is a potential unlimited source of energy, they developed a way to create Human-EVA hybrids, granting amazing powers to the subjects of the test.

In China, the powerful Fung Family (or "Maple Group") consortium decided to begin its own line of investigations, but found problems on getting their own CORE samples. That changes when a mysterious sect called "SHINE" appears and offers them an amount of CORE crystals, with unknown intentions.

Realizing only the strongest subjects can resist the bond with the CORE crystals, the Fung Family announces a worldwide fighting tournament called the XD Tournament, and many martial artists representing various organizations sign up to win the prizes.

== Fighters ==
The first build of the game was launched with five characters in the initial roster. Later updates added up more characters. As of October 23, the character list was the following:

- Ell Blue (艾尔.布鲁, Aier Bulu). The original protagonist of the game, an agent of the CRD whose goal is becoming the next leader of the organization. He has the power to produce lighting and tracks down other EVA hybrids in order to absorb their powers.
- Brazel (布雷泽, Bùléizé). The Spanish President of the SHINE sect, and an EVA-Hybrid himself with the power over chaos flames, he has the secret intention to destroy humanity.
- Kaoru Kuraki (仓木 薰, Cangmu Xun). A Japanese pop idol, she is secretly an android, created by LSAI (Life, Science and Artificial Intelligence) to be the perfect girl. She has the power of creating kinetic energy. In Fighting Days, she utilizes a pair of pistols and special firearms.
- Shanwoo (玄武, Xuandu). An underground fighter from a minority ethnic hill tribe in Yunnan. He enters the tournament for revenge, after the CRD closed a factory he maintained to support poor children.
- Arashi Tsukikage (月影 岚, Yueying Lan). A mutant created by the CRD scientists, as a failed product of a CORE experiment. He's become psychotic and put under the orders of Ell Blue.
- Yan (赤炎, Chi Yan). Heir of the Fung Family and Kaoru's Big Brother with the second EVA Hybrid to be created. He has the power to create and release blasts of fire and is the second protagonist of the game.
- Claire Fox (克莱尔, Kelaier). A British college student member of the European division of the Fung Family, and Yan's girlfriend. She is an EVA Hybrid with the power to create ice and freeze her opponents.
- Ameth (紫瞳, Zi Tong). A fox spirit in the form of a beautiful woman. She needs to consume powerful souls in order to attain immortality in the eve of a "Millennial Event".
- Legend (雷煌, Lei Huang). Related to the Fung Family by marriage, he is an old martial artist who exiled himself in the mountains after being possessed by an evil spirit and killing some members of his family.
- Ray (雷岳, Lei Yue). A wrestler from the military, he gets in the tournament to investigate and report to the Chinese Army. He is secretly Legend's younger brother, who survived his attack, and now wants to take revenge on him.
- Dragon (龙, Long). A crime-fighting jeet kun do expert, literally cloned from Bruce Lee's DNA.
- Prayuth (巴狱, Bayu). A young muay Thai champion who began as a poor kid in the slums. He gets in the tournament to have a rematch with Ameth, who previously defeated him.
- Panda (胖达, Panda). A scientist investigating the CORE that was mutated into a giant panda.
- Lee Won Hee (李媛熙, Li Yuanxi). A young Korean girl who practices taekwondo and enters the tournament hoping to win the prize and save her family dojang during an economic crisis in her country.
- Linn (琳恩, Lin En). A Taiwanese schoolgirl who practices karate and is proficient with ki control. She enters the tournament after knowing she could eat food from all the world.
- Wuxie (百里无邪, Baili Wuxie). A young Chinese-American shaolin martial arts practitioner who enters the tournament trying to reconnect with his roots.
- Shirley (雪莉, Xueli). A high-ranked SHINE secretary, and an EVA Hybrid with the ability to create gusts of wind.
- Sheva (蛇吻, Shewen). An effeminate hairdresser from Western Europe, who attacks using poisonous perfume.
- CoolB (酷比, Ku Bi). An interdimensional traveller from the "QQ" dimension. He takes the form of a little kid and has the power to set and burst "sugar bombs".
- Cloud (云飞, Yunfei). A soldier from the CRD Black Guards, he is in charge of the security of the event and fights using army weapons including guns, knives, and even rocket launchers.
- Jack (杰克, Jiékè). An English swordsman that worked as a thief and infiltrator. He enters to the tournament looking for the whereabouts of Odin, his stepfather, who was apparently abducted by the Fung Family.
- Ruriy (琉璃, Liuli). A Tao exorcist with magic abilities who enters the tournament to dispel evil energies she feels within.
- King (劲, Jin). A young martial artist with ki abilities, and third protagonist of the game, that enters to the tournament with the sole purpose of winning.
- Ciel (雪儿, Xuěr). A Chinese girl who is Claire's cousin and King's friend, and fights in rollerskates.
- Xeno (希诺, Xīnuò). Another King's ally and the German CRD representative and who fights aided by a pair of mechanical gloves.
- Blast (公子烈, Gōngzǐ Liè). A musician that fights attacking with his guitar and can produce fire.
- Seal (商之溟, Shāng Zhī Míng). A music composer and friend with Blast, uses his ice-imbued guitar to fight.
- Andrei (安德烈, Āndéliè). A Russian professional boxer with a very patriotic determination.
- Kuya (九夜, Jiǔyè). A Chinese swordsman from Macau. He is the steward for Yan's family.
- Crazy Brazel (觉醒布雷泽, Juéxǐng Bùléizé, lit. "Awakened Brazel"). Unplayable powered-up version of Brazel, and boss of the game.

=== Guest characters ===
The SNK guest characters were added to the game on August 5, 2014, but they were removed from the game on January 15, 2015, following a change in terms of negotiation between Tencent and SNK Playmore.

- Terry Bogard. An American martial artist who travels around the world looking for the strongest fighters to fight with. He is the protagonist of the Fatal Fury fighting game series.
- Benimaru Nikaido. A Japanese bishonen and an expert in shoot boxing, that has the ability to produce lightning. He is part of the Hero team from The King of Fighters series.

== Development ==
In April 2013, Tencent confirmed a strategic alliance with SNK Playmore, developers of the King of Fighters series, and the first step was including characters Terry Bogard and Benimaru Nikaido as guest fighters for the game: The two characters were added to the game in August 2013.

Somewhere after May 2014, Jade Studio was dismantled following a restructuring plan by Tencent, and the game entered what Tencent called at the time a development hiatus. The SNK guest characters were "temporarily removed" from Xuan Dou Zhi Wang on January 5, 2015, as a consequence of this reassignment, but developers stated the rights over those characters would be reacquired later.

== Fantasy Fighter ==
In contrast to the original Xuan Dou Zhi Wang fighting game, Fantasy Fighter instead is a beat'em up game

In September 2013, a spin-off of the game for mobile systems was announced. It departed from the gameplay of the PC version and plays instead as a 1-player beat'em up game. The spinoff, titled Tian Tian Xuan Dou (天天炫斗, Fighting Days) was released for iOS and Android and released in English language as Fantasy Fighter. The game featured redesigns of characters Yan, Claire, Brazel, Ell Blue, Kaoru Kuraki and Seal, as well as original characters not present in the fighting game for PC:

- Catherine (凯瑟琳, Kǎisèlín), a card-wielding female magician.
- Constantine (康士坦丁, Kāngshì Tǎn Dīng), a Shinigami equipped with a scythe and demonic powers.
- Looli (洛漓, Luò Kí). A witch that's bonded to her dead sister Luo Ling. She employs a variety of supernatural attacks of her katana as a mean of attack.
- Lv Bu (吕布, Lǚbù), guest character from Honor of Kings that fights with a huge trident and rides a horse.
- Tidal (龙汐, Lóng Xī), A woman armed with a spear imbued with the power of the dragon.
- Kagura Suzune (神乐铃音, Shén Lè Líng Yīn), a beautiful geisha that defends using hand fans, umbrellas and traditional Japanese dance moves.
- Lucas (卢卡斯, Lú Kǎ Sī), a young man that fights with a flying skateboard.
- Xuanxuan (炫炫, Xuàn Xuàn), a female "Shadow Apostle" wearing a cat hoodie, that fights using dark magic in form of blades and chains.
- Star (星烬, Xīng Jìn), a boy wielding an energy switchblade that can turn into different kinds of weapons.

Guest characters from The King of Fighters series Kyo Kusanagi and Mai Shiranui were announced and subsequently added to the game in 2015, but later removed. The English version of Fantasy Fighter was shut down in February 2018.

== Reception ==
At first, the game was received with skepticism or derision from Chinese players, that considered it a shameless knock-off of The King of Fighters series. After it was reported to Western media for first time, it received similar criticism. However, after the alliance with SNK, as well as more original characters being developed, this criticism softened. Kyo's guest appearance in Fantasy Fighter was praised by 17173 for retaining his stylish design as well as incorporating his unique techniques from his series.
