= Can You See Me Now? =

Urban chase game

Can You See Me Now? (often abbreviated CYSMN?) is a location-based pervasive game and artwork created by the British group Blast Theory in collaboration with the Mixed Reality Laboratory at the University of Nottingham. First staged in Sheffield in 2001, it set online players against performers ("runners") on the streets of a real city, and became one of the most widely discussed early works of locative media art and mixed-reality performance.

== Gameplay ==
Online players, who can take part from anywhere, navigate a three-dimensional model of the host city's streets and exchange tactics by text chat. On the streets of the real city, Blast Theory runners, their positions tracked by GPS and shown live on the same map, attempt to reach the players' on-screen locations. A player is caught when a runner arrives within a few metres of their virtual position; at that moment the runner photographs the physical spot, and the image—a "sighting"—is uploaded as a record of the encounter. On registering, each player is asked to name "someone you haven't seen for a long time that you still think of," a prompt that frames the chase around themes of absence and presence.

== Development and technology ==
Can You See Me Now? was made with the Mixed Reality Laboratory at Nottingham, with which Blast Theory had collaborated since 1998, and was built within the Equator interdisciplinary research project on its EQUIP software platform. Runners carried handheld computers, GPS receivers and walkie-talkies; for the first performance in Sheffield the equipment was mounted on a wooden board and sealed in a waterproof bag. Because consumer GPS of the period was imprecise, runners' positions could jump between streets, and the interface displayed estimates of GPS error and network connectivity. The handling of this uncertainty—as both a technical problem and a felt part of the experience—made the work a frequent subject of human–computer interaction research.

== Performances ==
The work premiered at the b.tv festival in Sheffield on 30 November and 1 December 2001. It was subsequently restaged in cities worldwide, with the virtual city rebuilt for each location; venues included the Dutch Electronic Art Festival in Rotterdam, the NTT InterCommunication Center in Tokyo, the Museum of Contemporary Art, Chicago, ArtFutura in Barcelona, and Tate Britain in London.

== Reception ==
Can You See Me Now? won the Prix Ars Electronica Golden Nica for Interactive Art in 2003 and was nominated for a BAFTA in the interactive arts category. Together with works such as Uncle Roy All Around You, it is cited as a pioneering example of locative media art, using positioning technology to stage an encounter between physical and networked space.
