= Equator IRC =

UK-based organization

Equator was an Interdisciplinary Research Collaboration (IRC) focused on experiences integrating physical and digital interactions, spanning six years and running over into the IPerG project. The collaboration concerned the launching of a number of "experiences", which were categorized.

== Collaborators ==
- University of Bristol
- University of Glasgow
- Lancaster University
- University of Nottingham
- Goldsmiths College
- University of Southampton
- University of Sussex
- University College London

== Experiences ==
- Applied Ultrasonic Sensing
- City
- Citywide Performance
  - Can You See Me Now?
  - Uncle Roy All Around You
- Curious Home
- Digital Care
- Playing and Learning
  - Ambient Wood
- Domestic Environment
- Environmental E-Science
- Seamful Games
- Seamful Games 2
- Shakra
- Sharing Awareness
- Public Performance

== See also ==
- Pervasive games
