= Parallel Kingdom =

2008 video game

- Developer: PerBlue
- Publisher: PerBlue
- Platforms: iOS, Android
- Release: October, 2008
- Genres: Role-playing video game, MMORPG

Parallel Kingdom was a mobile location-based massively multiplayer game that placed a player in a virtual world on top of the real world, based on the player's GPS location. Parallel Kingdom was the first location-based RPG for the iOS and Android platforms. The game was developed by PerBlue, a privately held mobile and social gaming software company founded in 2008 and based in Madison, Wisconsin. In 2011, the game's user base surpassed 1,000,000 players worldwide. The game closed on November 1, 2016.

The game was set in a virtual world or "Parallel Kingdom" where users claimed territories based on their GPS location or by making friends who could invite them to travel to new places. Parallel Kingdom was a freemium game, meaning it was free to download and play, but players had the option of purchasing premium content.

== Overview ==
=== Gameplay ===
Parallel Kingdom is a territorial RPG with a diverse range of ways to play. To travel around the world, a player has the option of using GPS to relocate through their phone or to build in-game flags on unclaimed areas. It has many features that allow for players to focus on various types of gameplay or to choose a unique combination of styles, such as PvE, PvP, Merchant, and Socialite.

In PvE, players can find a diverse range of NPCs to interact with. NPCs have many behaviours: some are docile, while others will attack the player (or anything that happens to get too close) on sight. Some can only be found alone, while others are always in packs. NPC difficulty is determined by a player's equipment level, meaning a player should be able to fight against monsters tailored to their equipment level. However, some enemies may have been spawned by another player in the area; these spawns may potentially be unsuitable for some players. Players choosing to play PvE have the choice trying their luck at exploring Dungeons. Dungeons are challenging themed areas that require a player to go through each and defeat the boss(es), which in turn will give them a special reward. Some PvE-oriented players can choose to avoid fighting altogether, choosing instead to explore or harvest and gather materials, such as wood and stone.

In PvP, Players can choose to duel one another, either in controlled city duelling arenas or anywhere outside in the world. Fighting in the open has some risks, though, as players lose a backpack and 3% of their experience upon death in addition to waiting 15 seconds before they are respawned. Players may also build a variety of buildings, such as Kingdoms and Flags, and can also claim limited resources such as Stone Mines. The nature of limited resources, including land, makes land a commodity, which is often the subject of trade and warfare throughout the game. There are many ways to fight one another, such as kingdom warfare, flag burning, and brawls.

Players can also choose to focus on Merchant or Socialite gameplay. PK has a large number of items available to gather and collect in-game, with features such as Trade Posts that allow players to buy and sell their items for currency. In addition, players have the ability to communicate through a variety of ways such as Map Chat, Kingdom Chat, Private Messages, and Global Chat.

=== Revisions ===
Parallel Kingdom has gone through five major iterations, known as "Ages", each of which introduced new features and gameplay mechanics. The final Age, Age of Ascension, was released on February 12, 2013, and featured the introduction of an immersive Sky Realm.

== Reception ==
Parallel Kingdom was nominated for four categories in the 2009 Best App Ever Awards: Best MMO, Best Augmented Reality Game, Most Creative Use of iPhone Hardware, and Best Use of Location Services.
Parallel Kingdom was a finalist in the Mashable Awards 2011, under the category of Best Mobile Game.

== Charitable contributions ==
In 2011, Parallel Kingdom partnered with PlayMob in "Food For Good". PK players could use the in-game currency, Food, to purchase real food for children suffering from droughts in Kenya. The initiative resulted in 2500 meal vouchers for SOS Children, said to be the world's largest charity for orphaned and abandoned children.

In June 2012, Parallel Kingdom partnered with PlayMobile in "Save a dog, Feed a cat, Buy a hat". PK players used in-game currency, Food, to purchase in-game limited edition hats.

In November 2012, Parallel Kingdom partnered with PlayMobile, again, in the event "HELP USA". PK players used in-game currency, Food, to purchase in-game limited edition turkey hats. The Parallel Kingdom community raised enough for 500 meals to be distributed by HELP USA.

== Decline and closing ==
The final content update of Parallel Kingdom arrived on December 16, 2014, bringing a winter event and the final set of in-game "swag". The game was then left with minimal developer support for the next two years.

On September 30, 2016, the developers announced that Parallel Kingdom would be going down for the final time after its eighth anniversary, at noon CST on November first. The article, in part, stated, "After 8 amazing years, we must say goodbye to an incredible world full of incredible people that kept it alive much longer than we ever thought was possible. Like you, a lot of us at PerBlue knew that closing Parallel Kingdom was an inevitability, but we all hoped in the back of our minds that the day wouldn't come."
