= Rider Spoke =

2007 performance art piece

Rider Spoke developed by Blast Theory in collaboration with the Mixed Reality Lab was first staged at the Barbican, London in October 2007. Created for cyclists, it combines elements of theatre, performance, game play and state of the art technology. Rider Spoke was built in the IPerG project on the EQUIP architecture.

Rider Spoke has since been presented in Athens (2008), Brighton (2008), Budapest (2008), Sydney (2009, Adelaide (2009) and Liverpool (2010).

== Academic References ==
Chamberlain, A and Benford, S. Eds, "Deliverable D17.3 A Cultural Console Game, Final Report", Rider Spoke, IperG (Integrated Project on Pervasive Gaming) 2008.

Chamberlain, A., Rowland, D., Foster, J. & Giannachi, G., "Riders Have Spoken: Replaying and Archiving Pervasive Performances". In Leonardo (journal), the journal for The International Society for the Arts, Sciences and Technology (Leonardo/ISAST) – Issue 43:1 2009.

Rowland, D., Flintham, M., Oppermann, L., Marshall, J., Chamberlain, A., Koleva, B., Benford, S & Perez, C. 'Ubikequitous Computing: Designing Interactive Experiences for Cyclists'. Mobile HCI 09. 15-18 September 2009, Bonn, Germany.

Oppermann, L., Flintham, M., Reeves, S., Benford, S., Greenhalgh, C., Marshall, J., Adams, M., Row Far, J. & Tandavanitj, N. 'Lessons from touring a location-based experience'. Pervasive 11. 12-15 June 2011, San Francisco, USA.

Chamberlain, A. 'Being: Physical – People, Performance, Art and Space'. HCI 09 (BCS-SIGCHI). ws, The Body in Communication, 1–5 September 2009, Cambridge, UK.
