= TiMi Studio Group =

Video game developer group

- Formerly: TiMi Studios
- Type: Subsidiary
- Industry: Video games
- Founded: December 3, 2008; 17 years ago
- Headquarters: Shenzhen, China
- Number of locations: 6 (2025)
- Areas served: Worldwide
- Key people: Colin Yao (vice president of Tencent & president of TiMi Studio Group)
- Products: Notable Games: Honor of Kings; Arena of Valor; QQ Speed: Mobile / Garena Speed Drifters; Contra Returns; Call of Duty: Mobile; Pokémon Unite
- Parent: Tencent Games
- Divisions: TiMi-J1|TiMi-J3|TiMi-L1|TiMi-T1|TiMi-Z1|TiMi-G1
- Website: www.timistudios.com

TiMi Studio Group (Chinese: 天美工作室群; pinyin: Tiānměi Gōngzuò Shìqún) is a video game developer group based in Shenzhen. A subsidiary of Tencent Games, it operates branches in Singapore, Los Angeles, Chengdu, and Shanghai. TiMi generated an estimated revenue of US$10 billion in 2020. Reportedly, TiMi is the largest video game operator and developer in the world by revenue. Founded in 2008 as Jade Studio, TiMi comprises several development divisions, developing titles such as Honor of Kings, Arena of Valor, Call of Duty: Mobile, Speed Drifters, Pokémon Unite and Delta Force. In 2014, Jade Studio merged with Wolong Studio and Tianmeiyiyou Studio to form TiMi Studio Group. In 2025, it was designated as a "Chinese military company" by the US.

== History ==
=== 2008–2013: Origins as Jade Studio ===
TiMi began in 2008 as Jade Studio (Note: Chinese: 琳琅天上工作室) in Shenzhen, China. The studio debuted into the Chinese PC gaming market with QQ Speed (Note: Chinese: QQ飞车端游) (known as GKART and Speed Drifters in Western markets), China's most successful racing game. As of July 2, 2019, Speed Drifters has 700 million registered users, with 200 million registered as mobile players. Following Speed Drifters, the studio released its own massive multiplayer online RPG (MMORPG) titled The Legend of Dragon (Note: Chinese: 御龙在天) in 2010 and first-person shooter (FPS) Assault Fire in 2012. In 2013, the studio released their final PC game which is a third-person shooter (TPS) titled Age of Gunslingers before they made their debut into mobile gaming with the release of WeChat exclusive games such as We Match and We Run.

=== 2014–2016: Formation of TiMi Studio Group and Chinese success ===
In 2014, Jade Studio merged with Wolong Studio from Chengdu and Tianmeiyiyou Studio from Shanghai to form TiMi Studio Group. Following the merge, in 2015, the group's development division TiMi-L1 debuted into mobile gaming with the massive Multiplayer Online Battle Arena (MOBA) game, Honor of Kings. As of July 2019, Honor of Kings is the most profitable mobile game globally of the first half of 2019, earning more than $728 million.

In 2016, the division introduced the King Pro League (KPL); an official competitive esport for Honor of Kings. (Note: Chinese: 王者荣耀) The KPL marked the division' and studio group' first entry into esports.

=== 2016–2020: Worldwide growth, Arena of Valor, Call of Duty: Mobile and Pokémon UNITE ===
Following the success of Honor of Kings, in 2016, the group's development division TiMi-J6 released Arena of Valor. (Note: Chinese: 傳說對決) The MOBA game was launched for mobile and Nintendo Switch in over 50 countries across Asia, Europe, North America and South America, expanding the group's reach worldwide, with more than 13 million monthly active users reported in May 2019. The game became a part of the esports demonstration event at the 2018 Asian Games, 2019 Southeast Asian Games and 2022 Asian Games.

On March 19, 2019, at the Game Developers Conference (GDC) in San Francisco, California, Activision announced that they were partnering with TiMi Studio Group to develop their upcoming title, Call of Duty: Mobile. The game was developed by the TiMi-J3 division and released worldwide on October 1, 2019. As of October 4, 2019, the game has surpassed 35 million downloads and over $2 million in revenue. In December 2019, the game received an award for Best Mobile Game at The Game Awards.

In June 2020, it was announced that the studio group and The Pokémon Company are developing a new Pokémon game, which was revealed on July 21, 2021, called Pokémon UNITE, a Multiplayer online battle arena (MOBA) game for mobile and Nintendo Switch.

=== 2020–2025: Team Kaiju, Code: J, Delta Force ===
In May 2020, the studio group announced ex-343 Industries and Ubisoft developer Scott Warner as Studio Head in North America. Scott Warner will lead TiMi's Team Kaiju (stylized as TEAM KAIJU), which was revealed on 15 October 2021. The subsidiary is working on one unnamed first-person-shooter (FPS) game for the PC and console market.

On June 27, 2020, the studio group and SNK announced a new unnamed mobile game, Code: J, for the classic arcade franchise Metal Slug.

In November 2020, the studio group announced that Honor of Kings set a record of 100 million average daily active users worldwide.

In July 2021, the group established a new division located in Canada, Montréal. The division's classification is TiMi-F1 and the development focus is an AAA open-world game.

In May 2021, the studio group announced a strategic partnership with Xbox Game Studios.

In August 2021, a controversy occurred on Twitter, which TiMi declared as language barrier issue. The account which wanted to post "everyone's rights are equally important" rather shared "what about hetro rights", implying that LGBTQI2+ people having no discrimination, thus creating a negative view off TiMi. Later in the year, September 2021, it was reported, that TiMi does not allow LGBTQI2±related terms in Pokémon UNITE.

In June 2022, TiMi L1 Studio, a development division of the group, announced a strategic partnership with Level Infinite on publishing Honor of Kings world-wide, where Level Infinite will take over the publishing, eSports, but TiMi the operations and community. The five versus five video game in the multiplayer online battle arena (MOBA) genre will adapt on areas where TiMi L1 Studio's Arena of Valor have a shared eSports with in Honor of Kings World Championship (KCC), under TiMi eSports, but did not reach the expected player base.

In August 2022, Nicolas 'Sparth' Bouvier announced that he had joined Team Kaiju as the Senior Art Director. Previously Sparth had been with the Halo franchise for 14 years, serving as the Art Director for most of that tenure.

In December 2023, TiMi Studio Group shut down Team Kaiju, including discontinuing their unannounced game. The team members were moved to other development divisions, and some left the group.

Honor of Kings was launched worldwide on June 20, 2024, following pre-releases in Brazil and Turkey as well as countries in the Middle East, North Africa, and the Commonwealth of Independent States.

In November 2024, it was reported that eSports General Manager of TiMi L1 Studio, Zhang Yijia, was forced to resign from his position due to corruption affairs.

Delta Force, a free-to-play first-person tactical shooter video game, was released for Windows, iOS, Android, PlayStation 5, and Xbox Series X and S in 2025.

=== 2025-present: Designation as a "Chinese military company" by the US ===
In January 2025, TiMi Studio Group's parent Tencent was labelled as a Chinese military company by the United States Department of Defense. After five years without releasing a game, TiMi Montreal was shut down in February 2026. TiMi and The Pokémon Company announced the shutdown of Pokémon UNITE for 22nd of March 2027.

== List of games ==
Year	Title	Genre(s)	Platform(s)	Development division(s)
2007	QQ Three Kingdoms	Massively multiplayer online role-playing	Microsoft Windows	L1
2008	QQ Speed (GKART / Speed Drifters)	Racing	Microsoft Windows	J1
2011	The King of Dazzling Fighters / King of Combat	Fighting	Microsoft Windows	J1
2012	The Legend of Dragon	Massively multiplayer online role-playing	Microsoft Windows	Z1
2012	Assault Fire	First-person shooter	Microsoft Windows	J3
2013	Age of Gunslingers	Third-person shooter	Microsoft Windows	J3
2013	We Match	Casual	Android, iOS	T1
2013	Parkour Everyday	Casual	Android, iOS	T1
2013	We Drift	Casual	Android, iOS	J1
2014	We Fight	Casual	Android, iOS	L1
2014	Fantasy Fighters	Fighting	Android, iOS	J1
2015	Crossfire Mobile	First-person shooter	Android, iOS	J3
2015	Honor of Kings	Multiplayer online battle arena	Android, iOS	L1
2016	Arena of Valor	Multiplayer online battle arena	Android, iOS, Nintendo Switch	L1
2016	The Legend of Dragon: Mobile	Massively multiplayer online role-playing	Android, iOS	Z1
2017	Contra Returns	Run and gun	Android, iOS	J1
2017	King of Chaos	Role-playing	Android, iOS	T1
2017	QQ Speed: Mobile / Garena Speed Drifters	Racing	Android, iOS	J1
2018	PUBG Army Attack	Battle royale	Android, iOS	J3
2018	Battle Through The Heavens	Massively multiplayer online role-playing	Android, iOS	Z1
2018	Saint Seiya: Awakening	Turn-based strategy role-playing	Android, iOS	L1
2019	Let's Catch Demons Together! / Let's Hunt Monsters	Casual	Android, iOS	J1
2019	Call of Duty: Mobile	Shooter	Android, iOS	J3
2021	Pokémon Unite	Multiplayer online battle arena, real-time strategy	Android, iOS, Nintendo Switch	J1
2022	Age of Empires: Return to Empire	real-time strategy	Android, iOS	T1
2023	Metal Slug: Awakening	Run and gun	Android, iOS	J1
2023	Party Stars	Battle-royal, racing, party	Android, iOS	T1
2024	Need for Speed Mobile	Racing	Android, iOS	J1
2024	Delta Force	First Person Shooter	Android, iOS, PlayStation, Xbox, PC	J3
TBA	Honor of Kings: World	Action-adventure	TBA	L1
TBA	Monster Hunter Outlanders	TBD	Mobile devices and phones	J1
TBA	Crossfire: Rainbow (Project: Spectrum)	First person/Third person shooter, Extraction shooter	PC and consoles	J1
