= Uncle Roy All Around You =

Pervasive game

Uncle Roy All Around You (URAY) is a pervasive game made by Blast Theory. URAY was built in the Equator project on the EQUIP architecture. "The defining characteristic of this game is the way it mixes preprogrammed game content with live performance that takes place on the city streets." Players "on the street" set out on a journey to find a fictional character called Uncle Roy. Simultaneously players online journeyed through a parallel 3D world, all the while guiding or misleading street players. The game was staged in May/June 2003 in central London. Players on the street were given a mobile device to use to navigate through the city and keep contact with game operators and online players. In URAY, self-reported positioning was used instead of location tracking. Street players were presented with a map that they could pan around and subsequently mark their location upon. The mobile device allowed street players to record and send short audio clips to the online players. The notable end of the game is when the street players find Uncle Roy's office where it is possible for the online to meet the street players through webcam. The street players are asked if they are willing to "commit to help a stranger for the next year and if so, whether they are prepared to release their personal contact details". Later the street players are invited into a limousine, where they are asked the same question. Players are paired up to meet if they both committed to the agreement.

Orchestration was particularly important in URAY to keep players out of danger in the streets and ensure players advanced through the stages of the game properly. Actors were used in some scenarios of the game and operators were sometimes required to deal with technical issues. The orchestration team consisted of more than 10 people.
