= Blast Theory =

British artist group

Blast Theory is an artists' group that specializes in work that mixes interactive media, digital broadcasting and live performance.

== Biography ==
The group was founded in 1991 by Matt Adams, Niki Jewett, Will Kittow and Ju Row Farr. The group is currently led by Matt Adams and Nick Tandavanitj. Ju Row Farr left her leadership role in 2023. Other members include the film maker, John Hardwick, and the late performer Jamie Iddon. Over its history, Blast Theory's work has explored interactivity and the social and political aspects of technology through a multitude of forms – using performance, installation, video, mobile and online technologies.

Currently based at their studios in Portslade, Blast Theory shows work nationally and internationally, working with a number of Associate Artists on different projects. The group has collaborated with The University of Nottingham's Mixed Reality Lab since 1998. Works created collaboratively with the MRL include Desert Rain (1999), Can You See Me Now? (2001) and Rider Spoke (2007). Blast Theory's work has been shown at NTT InterCommunication Center (ICC) in Tokyo, the Chicago Museum of Contemporary Art, Sydney Biennale, National Museum in Taiwan, Hebbel Theater in Berlin, Basel Art Fair, Dutch Electronic Arts Festival, Sónar Festival in Barcelona, and Palestine International Video Festival. Commissions include You Get Me (2008) at the Royal Opera House, Covent Garden; Ulrike and Eamon Compliant (2009) for the De La Warr Pavilion at the 53rd Venice Biennale; Spit Spreads Death: The Parade (2019) for the Mütter Museum in Philadelphia and We Cut Through Dust (2023) for the Manchester International Festival.

In 2015 the group launched Karen, an app that psychologically profiles the user.

== Approach ==
Blast Theory's artists describe their work as collaborative and interdisciplinary. Their practice mixes games design, interaction design, installation and performance.

Early works such as Gunmen Kill Three (1991) and Chemical Wedding (1994) fitted more in the category of live and performance art. Kidnap (1998) was a lottery inspired by the Spanner Trial in which participants paid for a chance to be kidnapped by the group. It was presented via video streaming.

Desert Rain (1999) was a large scale virtual reality game that saw a shift towards work that questions performativity, site and presence.

Blast Theory were pioneers in location-based art and mixed reality with works such as Can You See Me Now? (2001) and Uncle Roy All Around You (2003).

== Reception ==
Blast Theory's work has been influential in the fields of theatre, indie games, ARGs and mobile design. Desert Rain was described as ""one of the most complex and powerful responses to the first Gulf War to be produced within the sphere of theatrical practice" and "possibly the most technologically ambitious art installation ever made" in The Times.

In 2023 We Cut Through Dust was selected as one of the best works at the Manchester International Festival by Frieze. In an article in The Guardian on artists using AI to "reclaim AI from Big Tech" Gabrielle Schwarz highlighted Cat Royale's exploration of trust in AI. Blast Theory's work has been featured in over 130 books and journals.

== Selected works ==
- 1998 – Kidnap, a lottery in which participants paid for the chance to be kidnapped by the group
- 1999 – Desert Rain, a virtual-reality game and installation responding to the Gulf War
- 2001 – Can You See Me Now?, a location-based chase game made with the Mixed Reality Lab
- 2003 – Uncle Roy All Around You
- 2006 – Day of the Figurines
- 2007 – Rider Spoke
- 2009 – Ulrike and Eamon Compliant, commissioned for the De La Warr Pavilion at the 53rd Venice Biennale
- 2015 – Karen, a mobile app that psychologically profiles its user
- 2019 – Spit Spreads Death: The Parade, for the Mütter Museum in Philadelphia
- 2021 – A Cluster of 17 Cases, an online performance staged as a guided tour of a house
- 2023 – Cat Royale, an installation examining trust in artificial intelligence
- 2023 – We Cut Through Dust, commissioned for the Manchester International Festival

== Selected awards ==
- 2021 – Winner of The People's Choice Award, The Lovie Awards (UK) in Weird & Experimental for A Cluster of 17 Cases (UK)
- 2020 – Gold Winner, Video, Film, Animation & Live Media or Digital Performance, MUSE (American Alliance of Museums) for Spit Spreads Death: The Parade (USA)
- 2019 – Nomination, David and Yuko Art Foundation Grant (UK)
- 2019 – Winner of the 2019 Trailblazer Award, IndieCade (UK) for contributions to the field of games
- 2018 – Silver Winner, The Lovie Awards (UK) in Best Use of Interactive Video for 2097: We Made Ourselves Over
- 2016 – Nam June Paik Art Center Prize
- 2015 – Winner, British Interactive Media Association (UK) in Data Category, Best of British Digital for Karen
- 2015 – Winner, Festival du nouveau cinéma (CAN) Innovation Award for Karen
- 2015 – Bronze Winner, The Lovie Awards (UK) in Experimental & Innovation for Karen
- 2013 – The BIMA Awards (UK) – Nomination in Games category, I'd Hide You
- 2013 – The People's Lovie Awards (UK) – Winner in Events and Live Broadcast category for The Lovie Award and The People's Lovie Award, I'd Hide You
- 2012 – MUSE Awards (US) – Honourable Mention in the Applications & APIs category for Ghostwriter
- 2011 – Sheffield Doc/Fest Innovation Award (UK) – Nomination, Ulrike and Eamon Compliant
- 2010 – International Mobile Gaming Awards (Spain) – Winner Best Real World Game, Ulrike and Eamon Compliant
- 2009 – Brighton and Hove Business Awards (UK) – Winner of Most Awesome Use of Digital Media
- 2009 – 14th Annual Webby Awards (USA) – Nomination in NetArt category, You Get Me
- 2009 – IndieCade Festival of Independent Games (USA) – Finalist, You Get Me
- 2009 – Total Theatre Awards, Edinburgh Festival Fringe (UK) – Nomination in Innovation/Interaction/Immersion category, Rider Spoke
- 2008 – Winner of The Digital Collaboration Award at DiMA:S
- 2007 – Honorary Mention, Prix Ars Electronica for Day of the Figurines
- 2006 – Winner of The Hospital Award for Interactive Media
- 2005 – Winner of the Maverick Award, Game Developers Choice Awards, USA
- 2005 – Interactive Arts BAFTA Award, nominated for Uncle Roy All Around You in two categories: Interactive Arts and Technical & Social Innovation
- 2004 – Net Art Award, the Webby Awards, nominated for Uncle Roy All Around You
- 2003 – Winner of the Prix Ars Electronica 'Golden Nica' for Interactive Art for Can You See Me Now?
- 2003 – VIPER Basel International Award, nominated for Can You See Me Now?
- 2002 – Interactive Arts BAFTA Award, nominated for Can You See Me Now?
- 2002 – International Fellowship Award, Arts Council England
- 2002 – Innovation Award, Arts and Humanities Research Board, awarded for Uncle Roy All Around You
- 2001 – International Media Art Award, ZKM Centre for Arts and Media, Karlsruhe, nominated for Kidnap
- 2001 – Transmediale Awards, Berlin, Honorary Mention for Desert Rain
- 2000 – Interactive Arts BAFTA Award, nominated for Desert Rain
- 2000 – Breakthrough Award for Innovation, nominated, Arts Council England
- 1999 – The 18 Creative Freedom Awards, nominated for Kidnap
- 1996 – Winner of the Barclays New Stages Award, for Something American

== Key reading ==
- Performing Mixed Reality by Steve Benford and Gabriella Giannachi, MIT Press 2011
- Steve Benford, Rob Anastasi, Martin Flintham, Adam Drozd, Andy Crabtree, Chris Greenhalgh, Nick Tandavanitj, Matt Adams, Ju Row-Farr, 'Can You See Me Now?', Pervasive Computing, No.3, Volume 2, July/September 2003, pp. 49–51
- Blast Theory, Desert Rain (A Virtual Reality Game/Installation), 2002, pp. 1–36 (Blast Theory, London)
- Dixon, Steve 'Digital Performance, A history of new media in theatre, dance, performance art, and installation', 2007, pp. 616–621 (The MIT Press, Cambridge, UK)
- Giannachi, Gabriella 'About War and Inaction: Blast Theory's Desert Rain', Virtual Theatres: An Introduction, 2004, pp. 115–122 (Routledge, London)
- Emma Govan, Helen Nicholson and Katie Normington 'Making a Performance, Devising Histories and Contemporary Practices', 2008, pp. 179–187 (Routledge Taylor and Francis Group, London)
