= BotFighters =

2001 video game

- Developer: It's Alive Mobile Games AB!
- Platform: Mobile phone (SMS)
- Release: EU: March 14, 2001

BotFighters is a location-based mobile game and a pervasive game, developed by It's Alive Mobile Games AB! (acquired by Digiment in 2007) designed to be a MMORPG played in an urban environment. It was possibly the world's first commercial location-based game. It was first released in Sweden on 14 March 2001, and later in Russia, Finland, Ireland and China.

In 2002, it was awarded with an Award of Distinction, Net Vision category in the Prix Ars Electronica.

The mission of the game was to locate and destroy other players. Each player was represented in the game as a robot warrior. Successful battles were rewarded with money which could be traded in, via a website, for armor upgrades and other features for the player's robot. The game was temporally expansive, because there were no safe zones or timeouts; players were always playing. The likeness of the game has been compared to that of Paintball. The game is no longer playable.

== Gameplay ==
BotFighters was a location-based mobile game and a pervasive game, that made use of the positioning technology of a mobile phone in playing the game. Players created and equipped robot avatars on the game's website, then used SMS commands on their phones to search for nearby opponents and attack when they were within range.

== See also ==
- Location-based mobile game
- Alternate reality game
- Location-based service
- Sentient computing
- Ubiquitous computing
