= Mixed reality game =

Types of electronic games involving reality and VR

A mixed reality game (or hybrid reality game) blends elements of both the real and virtual worlds, allowing players to interact with both reality and virtual reality simultaneously. According to Souza de Silva and Sutko, the defining characteristic of such games is their "lack of primary play space; these games are played simultaneously in physical, digital or represented spaces (such as a game board)".

Based on the virtuality continuum defined by Paul Milgram and Fumio Kishino, virtual reality (VR) games differ from mixed reality (MR) games, as VR games occur entirely in virtual environments without interaction with physical spaces. Examples of mixed reality games include Pokémon GO and Harry Potter: Wizards Unite. Souza de Silva and Sutko state that pervasive games are a subset of hybrid reality games.

== Virtual reality, augmented reality, and mixed reality ==
VR, AR, and MR differ in how virtual content relates to the player's physical environment. The easiest way to distinguish between them is how the player interacts with their real-life environment while playing the game.

VR games place the player within a virtual environment rather than integrating virtual elements with the physical play space. AR games blend reality and allow players to remain grounded in reality with virtual elements such as audio, text, or video graphics superimposed onto their physical environment. However, AR overlays cannot interact with their environment. Finally, MR overlays the real world with digital elements in a way that allows them to coexist and interact with each other in real time.

== Applications in healthcare ==
A 2022 systematic literature review examined the use of virtual, augmented and mixed reality games in healthcare.

== Examples of mixed reality games ==
- AR Car Game
- AR Mario Kart Live
- Harry Potter: Wizards Unite
- Human Pacman
- Ingress
- Pokémon GO
- Wanderlust
- Zombies Run
