= Location-based game =

Game which reacts to the player's location

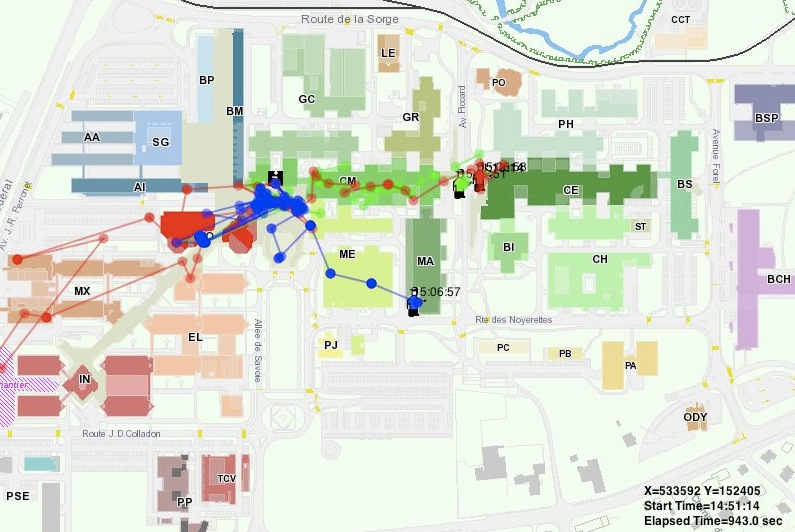
A map of players' trails in a location-based game

A location-based game (also called location-enabled game, geolocation-based game, or simply geo game) is a type of game in which the gameplay evolves and progresses via a player's real-world location. Location-based games must provide a mechanism for players to report their location, usually via GPS. Many location-based video games are video games that run on a mobile phone, using its GPS capability.

"Urban games" or "street games" are typically multiplayer location-based games played using city streets and built-up urban environments. Various mobile devices can be used to play location-based games. These games have been referred to as “location-based mobile games,” merging the concept of location-based games and mobile games.

== Games ==
Location-based games can be digital or physical. For example, Geocaching is an outdoor recreational activity in which participants use a Global Positioning System (GPS) receiver or mobile device and other navigational techniques to hide and seek containers. In contrast, games such as Pokémon Go are fully contained in digital devices with very little to no interaction or effect on the physical world.

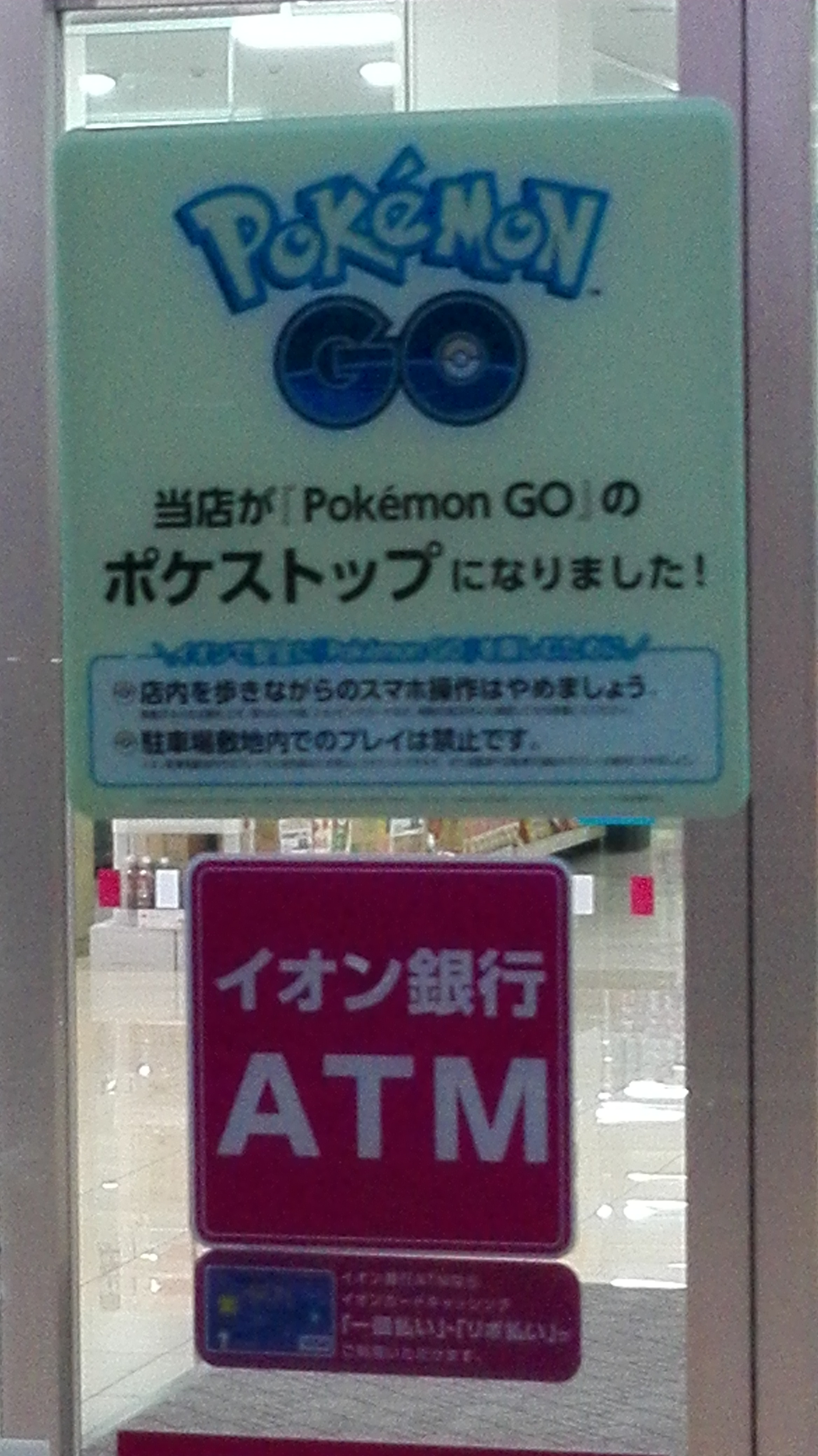
A PokéStop at Aeon Town Higashi-Osaka, an example of a real-world marking for the location-based game Pokémon Go

== Technology ==
Some location-based games that are video games have used embedded mobile technologies such as near field communication, Bluetooth and UWB. Such video games have also commonly used augmented reality to create an immersive experience. Games such as Pokémon Go and Ingress also use an Image Linked Map (ILM) interface, where approved geotagged locations appear on a stylized map generated based on GPS data for the user to interact with.

Early location-based video games typically used SMS as a medium and located players using cellular network's control plane locating requiring no additional capabilities from the user's device.

== Learning ==
Location-based games may induce learning, with researchers having observed that these activities produce learning that is social, experiential and situated. It primarily supports learning in geography, along with other subjects such as environmental education. Learning, however, is related to the objectives of the game designers.

The role-playing version of these games have a higher learning potential, which has been confirmed by studies on students using location-based games for learning. On the other hand, the social interaction that takes place and skills related to strategic decisions, observation, planning and physical activity are the main characteristics of this strand in terms of learning. The pedagogic group of games involve participatory simulators, situated language learning and educational action games. Finally, the hybrid games are mostly museum location-based games and mobile fiction, or city fiction.

== Concerns ==
In a paper titled "Death by Pokémon GO", researchers at Purdue University’s Krannert School of Management claim the game caused "a disproportionate increase in vehicular crashes and associated vehicular damage, personal injuries, and fatalities in the vicinity of locations, called PokéStops, where users can play the game while driving." Using data from one municipality, the paper extrapolated possible effects nationwide, concluding that "the increase in crashes attributable to the introduction of Pokémon GO is 145,632 with an associated increase in the number of injuries of 29,370 and an associated increase in the number of fatalities of 256 over the period of 6 July 2016, through 30 November 2016." The authors extrapolated the cost of those crashes and fatalities at between $2 billion and $7.3 billion for the same period.

== Legality ==
The nature of location-based gaming may mean that certain real-world locations will be visited by higher-than-normal numbers of people who are playing the game, which generally has been received favorably by nearby attractions or local businesses. However, these games may generate activity at locations that are privately-owned or have access limits, or otherwise cause undesirable congestion.

Pokémon Go notably has several publicized events of players being drawn to inappropriate locations for the game, requiring the developer to manually remove these areas from the game. In one of the first legal challenges for location-based gaming, a Federal District court ruled that a Wisconsin county ordinance to require game developers of such location-based games to get appropriate permits to allow locations in the county's public park systems was likely unconstitutional. While the county had felt there was no First Amendment rights involved due to how locations were generated in-game, the Federal judge disagreed.

The interaction of location-bound games with property law is largely undefined. Several models have been analysed for how this interaction may be resolved in a common law context: an extension of real property rights to also cover augmentations on or near the property with a strong notion of trespassing, forbidding augmentations unless allowed by the owner; an 'open range' system, where augmentations are allowed unless forbidden by the owner; and a 'freedom to roam' system, where real property owners have no control over non-disruptive augmentations.

One issue experienced during the Pokémon Go craze was the game's players disturbing owners of private property while visiting nearby location-bound augmentations. The terms of service of Pokémon Go explicitly disclaim responsibility for players' actions, which may limit (but may not totally extinguish) the liability of its producer, Niantic, in the event of a player trespassing while playing the game: by Niantic's argument, the player is the one committing the trespass, while Niantic has merely engaged in permissible free speech. A theory advanced in lawsuits brought against Niantic is that their placement of game elements in places that will lead to trespass or an exceptionally large flux of visitors can constitute nuisance, despite each individual trespass or visit only being tenuously caused by Niantic.

Another claim raised against Niantic is that the placement of profitable game elements on land without permission of the land's owners is unjust enrichment. More hypothetically, a property may be augmented with advertising or disagreeable content against its owner's wishes. Under American law, these situations are unlikely to be seen as a violation of real property rights by courts without an expansion of those rights to include augmented reality (similarly to how English common law came to recognise air rights).

Some attempts at legislative regulation have been made in the United States. Milwaukee County, Wisconsin, attempted to regulate location-based games played in its parks, requiring prior issuance of a permit, but this was criticised on free speech grounds by a federal judge; and Illinois considered mandating a notice and take down procedure for location-bound augmentations.

== Consumer countries ==
Japan is the world's biggest market for consumer spending on location-based titles like Pokémon Go and Dragon Quest Walk, having generated over $620 million in 2023, equivalent to 50% of the genre's global revenue. By comparison, the United States is the second largest market for this genre, spending over $380 million on the top five games. South Korea's spending on its top five came in at less than $16 million.

== Notable examples ==
- Pokémon Go
- Ingress
- Geocaching
- BotFighters
- Dragon Quest Walk
- Cluetivity
- Pikmin Bloom
- Jurassic World Alive

== See also ==
- Alternate reality game
- Encounter (game)
- Entertainment district
- Far-Play, a location-based game platform.
- Geosocial networking
- Location-based service
- Mixed reality game
- Mscape, a location-based game platform.
- Pervasive game
- Sentient computing
- Ubiquitous computing
- Geocaching
- Transreality gaming
