= Mobile game =

Video game played on a mobile device

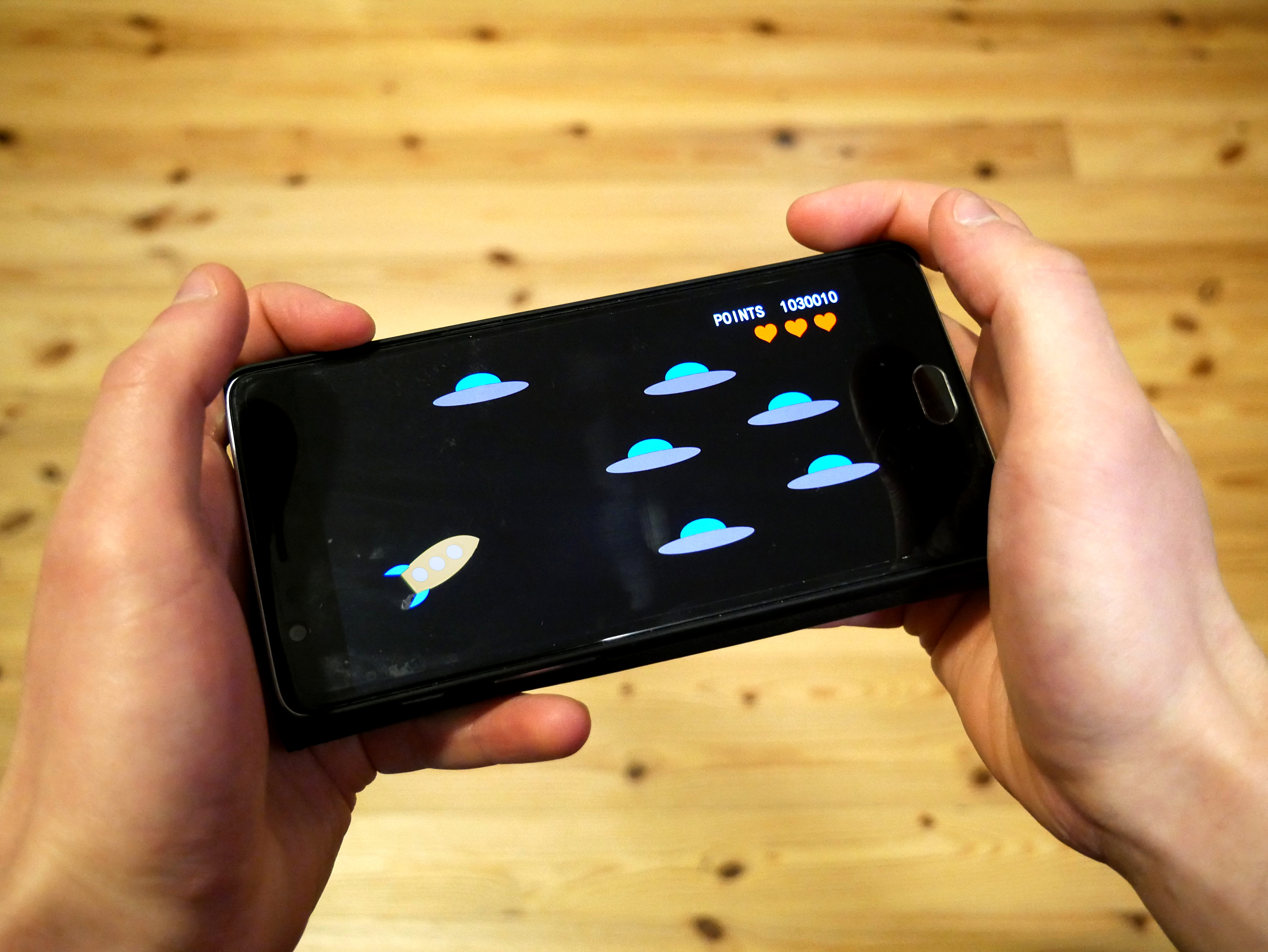
A game being played on a smartphone

A mobile game is a video game played on a mobile device. The term may also refer to any game played on a portable device, such as a mobile phone, tablet, PDA, handheld game console, portable media player, or graphing calculator, with or without network availability. The earliest mobile phone game was a Tetris variant released on the Hagenuk MT-2000 in 1994.

In 1997, Nokia launched Snake, which came pre-installed on Nokia devices for a number of years. Snake was recorded to be on 350 million devices worldwide. Through most of the 2000s, the majority of mobile games were powered by Java (J2ME).

As technology advanced, users became able to purchase and download games onto their devices. Initially limited to stores controlled by mobile network carriers, mobile gaming grew rapidly with the development of app stores in 2008: Apple's App Store was the first mobile content marketplace operated directly by a mobile-platform holder, significantly altering consumer behavior by increasing access to downloadable mobile apps and granting more leverage and opportunity to independent developers.

Mobile gaming is the largest and most lucrative sector of the video game industry today, accounting for 49% of total global gaming revenue in 2025.

== History ==
Toward the end of the 20th century, mobile phone ownership became increasingly widespread worldwide, driven by the establishment of industry standards, the rapid decline in handset costs, and growing consumer demand. As a result of this explosion, technological advancement by handset manufacturers became rapid.

With these technological advances, mobile phone games also became increasingly complex due to improvements in display, processing, storage, interfaces, network bandwidth, and operating system functionality. The first game that indicated a demand for handset games was a version of Snake that Nokia had included on its devices since 1997.

In 1999, NTT Docomo launched the i-mode mobile platform in Japan, allowing mobile games to be downloaded onto smartphones. Several Japanese video game developers announced games for the i-mode platform that year, such as Konami announcing its dating simulation Tokimeki Memorial. In the same year, Nintendo and Bandai were developing mobile phone adapters for their handheld game consoles, the Game Boy Color and WonderSwan, respectively. By 2001, i-mode had 20 million users in Japan, along with more advanced handsets with graphics comparable to 8-bit consoles. A wide variety of games were available for the i-mode service, along with announcements from established video game developers such as Taito, Konami, Namco, and Hudson Soft, including ports of classic arcade games and 8-bit console games.

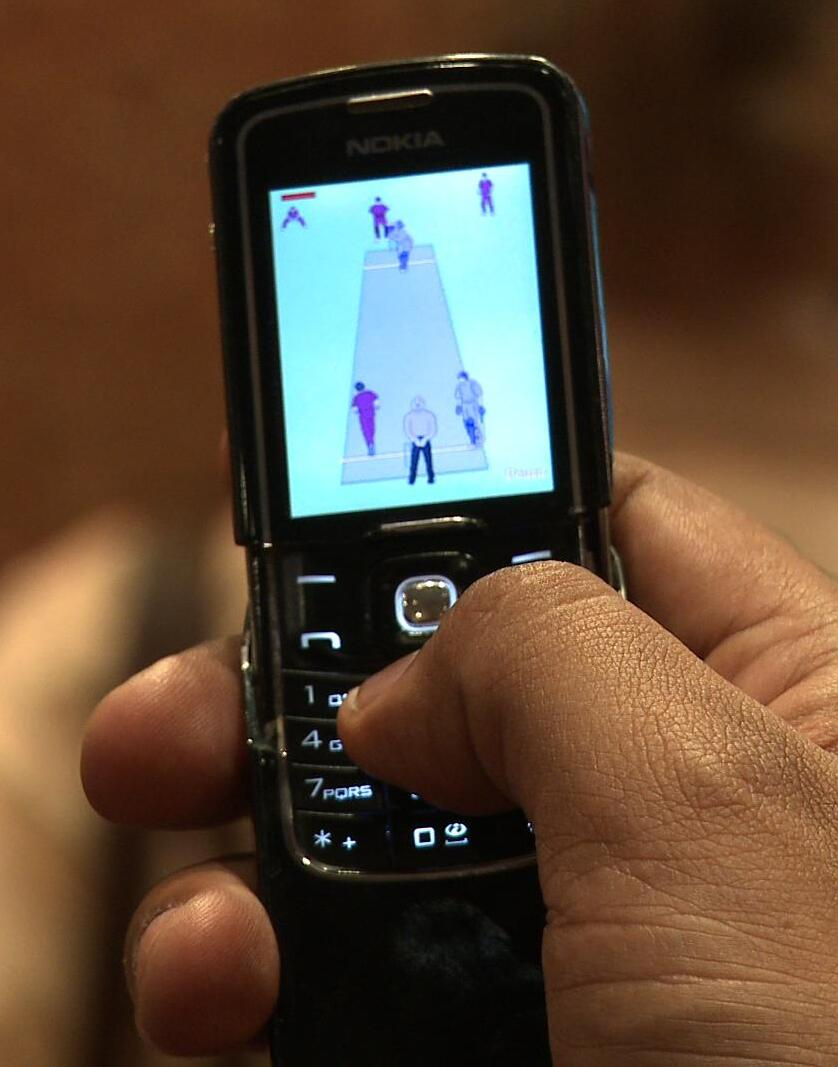
A cricket game being played on a 2007 Nokia 8600 Luna phone

By the mid-2000s, there was a large market for mobile games, of which many were built on the Java ME platform that many devices at the time supported. Earlier, they could be obtained using SMS short codes before manufacturers and mobile network operators started offering them for download both on the Web (on a PC to be transferred to the device) and directly via the air (using GPRS, 3G, or Wi-Fi).

The launch of Apple's iPhone in 2007 and the App Store in 2008 altered the market. The iPhone's focus on larger memory, multitasks, and additional sensing devices, including the touchscreen in later models, made it suited for casual games, while the App Store, which is also independent from mobile carriers, made it easy for developers to create and publish apps, and for users to search for and obtain new games. Further, the App Store added the ability to support in-app purchases in October 2009. This allowed games like Angry Birds and Cut the Rope to find new monetization models away from the traditional premium "pay once" model. The market stabilized around iPhone devices and Google's Android-based phones which offered a similar app store through Google Play.

A further major shift came with 2012's Candy Crush Saga and Puzzle & Dragons, games that used a stamina-like gameplay feature found in social-network games like FarmVille to limit the number of times one could play it in a single period, but allowed optional in-app purchases to restore that stamina immediately and continue playing. This new monetization brought in millions of players to both games and millions of dollars in revenue, establishing the "freemium" model that would be a common, but controversial approach for many mobile games going forward.

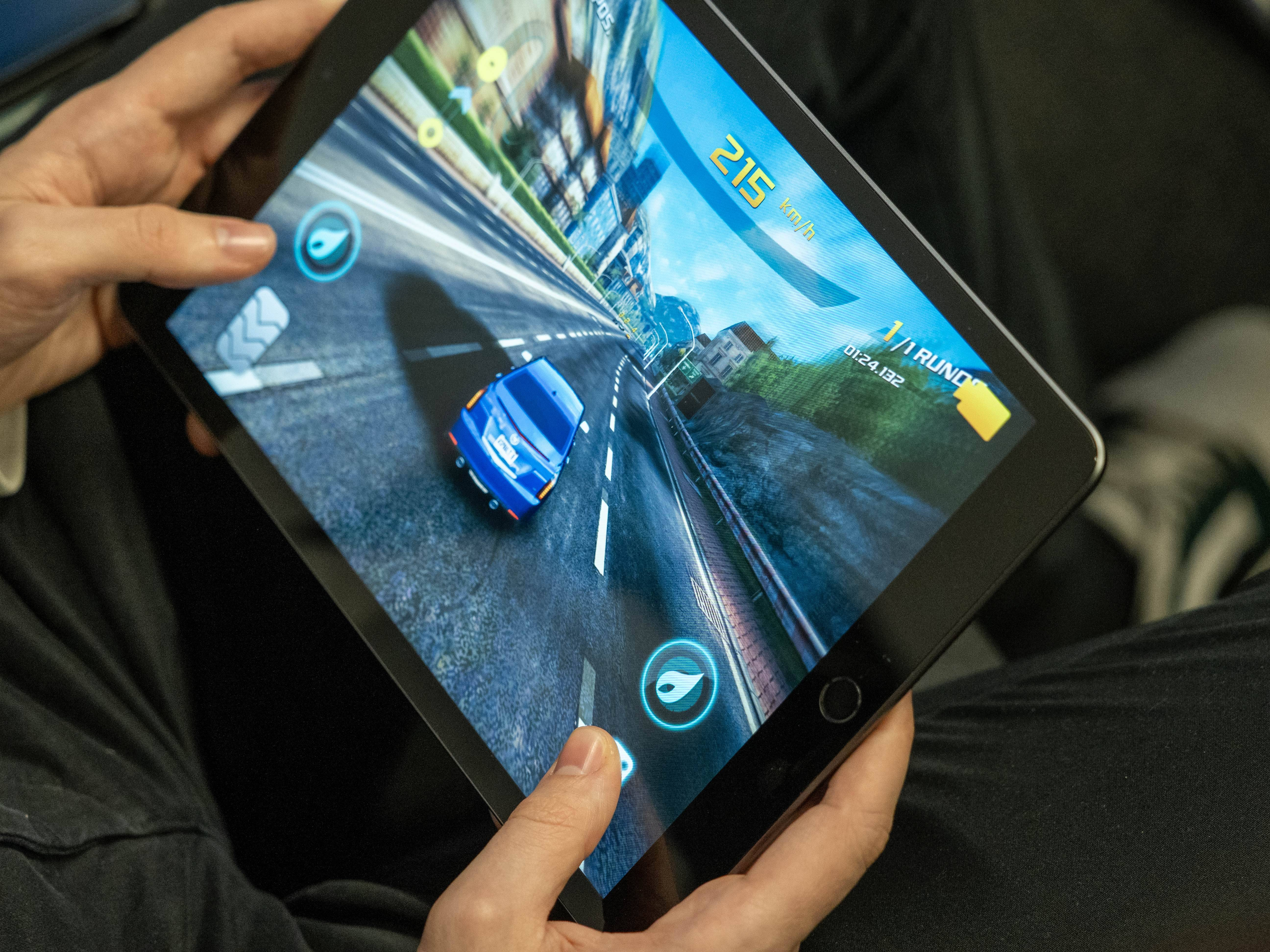
Asphalt 8: Airborne (2013) being played on an iPad

Mobile gaming grew rapidly over the next several years, buoyed by rapid expansion in China. By 2016, top mobile games were earning over US$100 million a year, and the total revenue for the mobile games sector had surpassed that of other video game areas.

Other major trends in mobile games include hyper-casual games such as Flappy Bird or Crossy Road, and location-based games like Pokémon Go.

Mobile gaming has impacted the larger video game market by drawing demand away from handheld video game consoles; both Nintendo and Sony had seen major drops in sales of their eighth generation handhelds compared to their seventh generation predecessors as a result of mobile gaming. At the same time, mobile gaming introduced the concept of microconsoles, low-cost, low-powered home video game consoles that used mobile operating systems to take advantage of the wide variety of games available on these platforms.

=== Calculator games ===
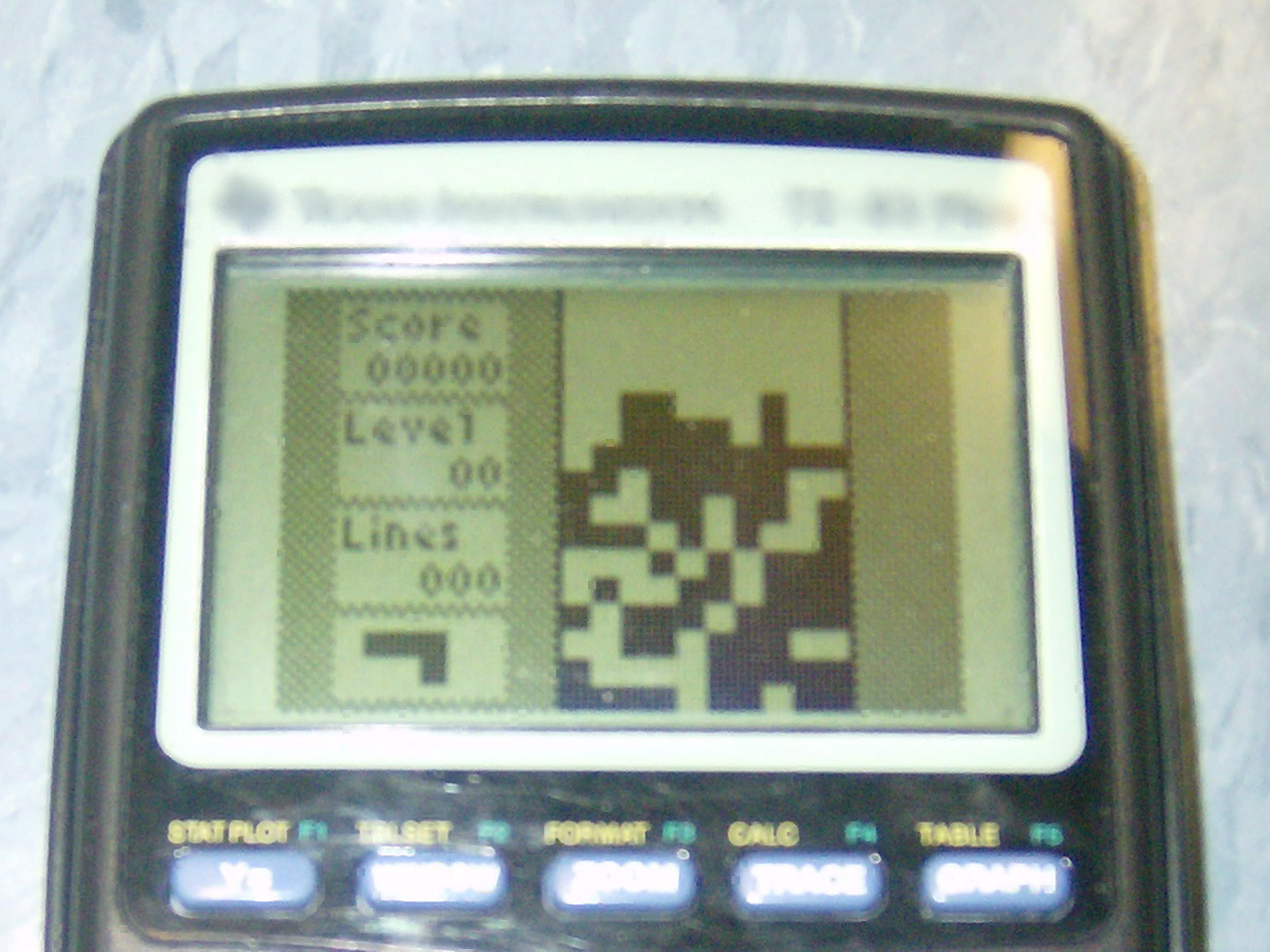
Clone of Tetris being played on a modified TI-83 Plus

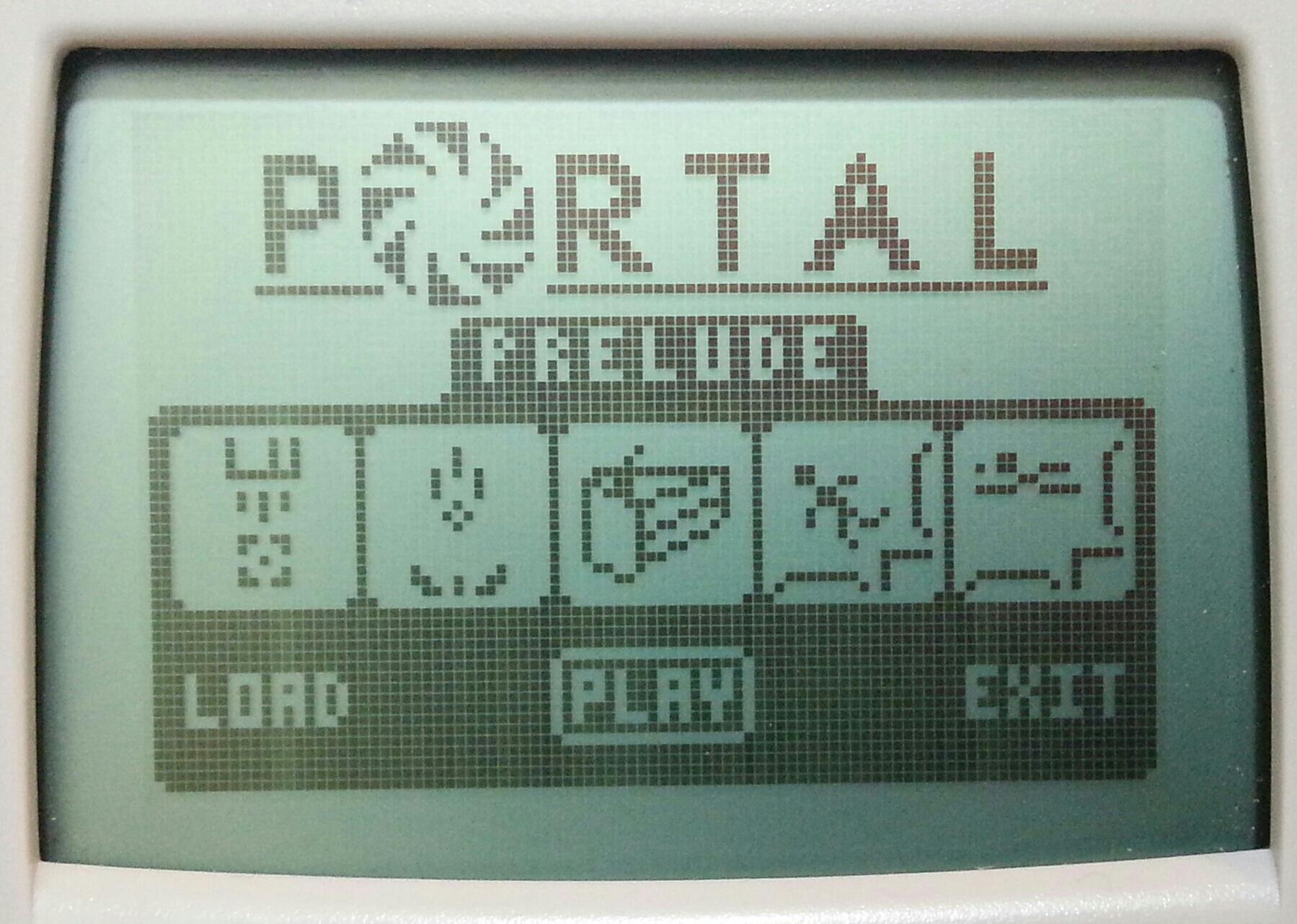
A fan-made game similar to the game Portal

Calculator gaming is a form of gaming in which games are played on programmable calculators, especially graphing calculators.

In 1980, Casio's MG-880 pocket calculator had a built-in "Invaders" game (essentially a downscaled Space Invaders clone), released in the summer that year. Another early example is the type-in program Darth Vader's Force Battle for the TI-59, published in BYTE in October 1980. The magazine also published a version of Hunt the Wumpus for the HP-41C.

Few other games exist for the earliest of programmable calculators (including the Hewlett-Packard 9100A, one of the first scientific calculators), such as the long-popular Lunar Lander game often used as an early programming exercise. However, limited program address space and a lack of easy program storage made calculator gaming a rarity even as programmables became cheap and relatively easy to obtain. It was not until the early 1990s that graphing calculators became more powerful and cheap enough to be common among high school students for use in mathematics. The new graphing calculators, with their ability to transfer files to one another and from a computer for backup, could double as game consoles.

Calculators such as HP-48 and TI-82 could be programmed in proprietary programming languages such as RPL programming language or TI-BASIC directly on the calculator; programs could also be written in assembly language or (less often) C on a desktop computer and transferred to the calculator. As calculators became more powerful and memory sizes increased, games increased in complexity.

By the 1990s, programmable calculators were able to run implementations by hobbyists of games such as Lemmings and Doom (Lemmings for HP-48 was released in 1993; Doom for HP-48 was created in 1995). Some games such as Dope Wars caused controversy when students played them in school.

The look and feel of these games on an HP-48 class calculator, due to the lack of dedicated audio and video circuitry providing hardware acceleration, can at most be compared to the one offered by 8-bit handheld consoles such as the early Game Boy or the Gameking (low resolution, monochrome or grayscale graphics), or to the built-in games of non-Java or BREW enabled cell phones.

Games continue to be programmed on graphing calculators with increasing complexity. A wave of games appeared after the release of the TI-83 Plus/TI-84 Plus series, among TI's first graphing calculators to natively support assembly. TI-BASIC programming also rose in popularity after the release of third-party libraries. Assembly remained the language of choice for these calculators, which run on a Zilog Z80 processor, although some assembly implementations have been created to ease the difficulty of learning assembly language. For those running on a Motorola 68000 processor (like the TI-89), C programming (possibly using TIGCC) had begun to replace assembly.

Because they can be programmed without outside tools, calculator games have survived despite the proliferation of mobile devices such as mobile phones and PDAs.

== Different platforms ==
Mobile games have been developed to run on a wide variety of platforms and technologies including the (today largely defunct) Palm OS, Symbian, Adobe Flash Lite, NTT DoCoMo's DoJa, Sun's Java, Qualcomm's BREW, WIPI, BlackBerry, Nook, and early incarnations of Windows Mobile.

Today, the most widely supported platforms are Apple's iOS and Google's Android. The mobile version of Microsoft's Windows 10 (formerly Windows Phone) is no longer actively supported as of 2020.

Java was at one time the most common platform for mobile games; its performance limits led to the adoption of various native binary formats for more sophisticated games.

Due to its ease of porting between mobile operating systems and extensive developer community, Unity is one of the most widely used engines used by modern mobile games. Apple provides a number of proprietary technologies (such as Metal) made for mobile developers.

== Monetization ==
With the introduction of the iOS App Store and support for in-app purchases by October 2009, the methods through which mobile games earn revenue have diverged significantly from traditional game models on consoles or computers. Since 2009, a number of models have been developed, and a mobile game developer/publisher may use one or a combination of these models to make revenue.

Premium
The premium model is akin to the traditional model where the user pays for the full game upfront. Additional downloadable content may be available which can be purchased separately. Initial games released to the App Store before in-app purchases were available used this approach, and it is still common for many types of games.

Freemium
The freemium or "free to try" model offers a small portion of the game for free, comparable to a game demo. After completing this, the player is given the option to make a one-time in-app purchase to unlock the rest of the game. Early games shortly after the introduction of the in-app purchase feature used this approach such as Cut the Rope and Fruit Ninja.

Free-to-play
A free-to-play game requires no cost at all to play, and generally is designed to be playable from start to finish without having to spend any money in the game. However, the game will include gameplay mechanics that may slow progress towards completing the game. Commonly, this is some form of energy or stamina that limits how many turns or actions a player can take each day. By using in-app purchases, the player can immediately restore their energy or stamina and continue. In-app purchases can also be used to buy power-ups and other items to give the player a limited-time advantage to help complete the game. While free-to-play games had been common on computers before mobile, the method was popularized in mobile gaming with Candy Crush Saga and Puzzle & Dragons.

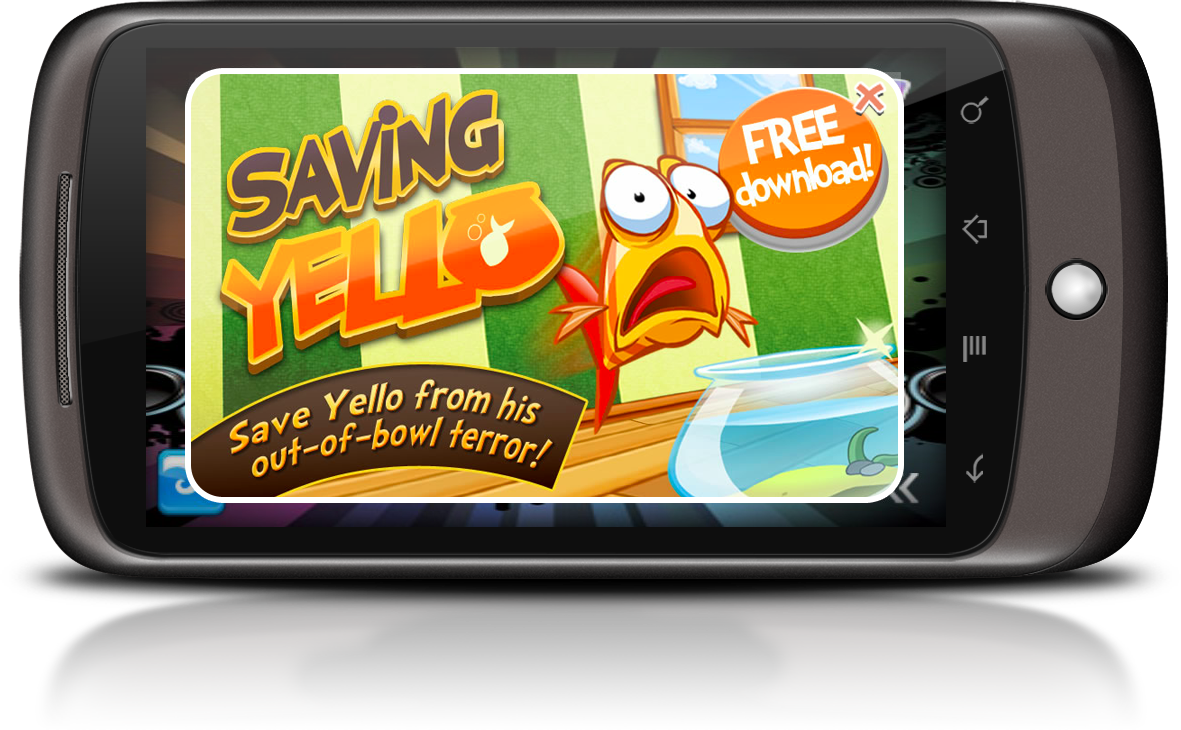
A mobile game displaying a full-screen interstitial ad for a different game

Advertising-supported
An ad-supported game is free to download and play, but periodically interrupts gameplay with advertisements. The developer earns revenue from the advertising network. In some cases, an in-app purchase allows the player to fully disable ads in these games.

Subscription model
A subscription-based game offers a base version with limited features that can be played for free, but additional premium features are obtained if the user pays a monthly subscription fee. If they terminate their subscription, they lose access to those features, though typically not any game progression related to those features, and can pick up those features later by restarting their subscription.

Many game apps are free to play through a combination of these models. Over time, mobile developers of these types of apps have observed that the bulk of their players do not spend any funds on their game, but instead revenues are generated from a small fraction, typically under 10%, of their total players. Most of the revenue is generated by a very small fraction, about 2% of the total players, who routinely spend large amounts of money on the game. A similar split on revenue had been seen in social-network games played in browsers. These players are colloquially termed "whales", inspired by the same term used for high rolling gamblers. The social nature of a mobile game has also been found to affect its revenue, as games that encourage players to work in teams or clans will lead to increased spending from engaged players.

Total global revenue from mobile games was estimated at $2.6 billion in 2005 by Informa Telecoms and Media. Total revenue in 2008 was $5.8 billion. The largest mobile gaming markets were in the Asia-Pacific nations Japan and China, followed by the United States. In 2012, the market had already reached $7.8 billion A new report was released in November 2015 showing that 1,887 app developers would make more than one million dollars on the Google and IOS app stores in 2015.

Mobile gaming revenue reached $113.3 billion in 2025, accounting for 56% of the global gaming market revenue, according to newzoo.

== Common limits of mobile games ==
Mobile games tend to be small in scope (in relation to mainstream PC and console games). Storage and memory limitations (sometimes dictated at the platform level) place constraints on file size that presently rule out the direct migration of many modern PC and console games to mobile. One major problem for developers and publishers of mobile games is describing a game in detail that it provides the customer enough information to make a purchasing decision.

== Location-based mobile games ==
Games played on a mobile device using localization technology like GPS are called location-based games or location-based mobile games. These are not only played on mobile hardware but also integrate the player's position into the game concept. While the location of the player is unimportant for a regular mobile game (giving them the ability to play these games anywhere at any time), the player's coordinates and movement are the main elements in a location-based mobile game.

A well-known example is the outdoor recreational activity of geocaching, which can be played on any mobile device with an integrated or external GPS receiver. External GPS receivers are typically connected through Bluetooth.

Several location-based mobile games, such as the 2001 game BotFighters, were closer to research prototypes rather than being commercial successes. Location-based mobile games can have augmented reality functionality, such as the 2016 game Pokémon Go.

== Augmented reality games ==
Mobile devices have been used as a platform for Augmented reality (AR in short) games, using the device's camera as an input for the game. While playing the game, the player aims the device's camera at a location and through the device's screen, the player can see the area captured by the camera while using computer-generated graphics to augmentate the display. Then, it allows the player to interact with the area around them. The graphics are generally drawn to make the generated image appear to be part of the captured background and will be rendered accurately as the player moves the device around. The most successful and notable example for a mobile game that has an augmented reality feature is Pokémon Go (2016), where the player travels to locations marked on their GPS map and can enable the augmented reality mode to find Pokémon creatures to capture. However, as of January 2022, there has been a lack of significant AR mobile game success since, with several game projects of the sort being shut down, such as Microsoft's Minecraft Earth and Niantic's Catan: World Explorers.

== Multipurpose games ==
Since mobile devices have become present in the majority of households in developed countries, an increasing number of games have been created with educational, lifestyle, health improvement purposes. For example, mobile games can be used in speech-language pathology, children's rehabilitation in hospitals, acquiring new useful or healthy habits, memorizing information, and learning languages. Applications with similar purposes which are not strictly games are called gamified apps.

== Multiplayer mobile games ==
Many mobile games support multiple players, either remotely over a network or locally through Wi-Fi, Bluetooth or similar technology.

There are several options for playing multiplayer games on mobile phones such as live synchronous tournaments and turn-based asynchronous tournaments. In live tournaments, random players from around the world are matched together to compete. This is done using different networks such as Game Center, Google Play Games, and Facebook.

Asynchronous gameplay resolves the issue of needing players to have a continuous live connection. This is through using different networks, including Facebook. This gameplay is different since players take individual turns in the game, therefore, allowing them to continue playing against human opponents.

In asynchronous tournaments, there are two methods used by game developers centered around the idea that players' matches are recorded and later broadcast to other players in the same tournament. Some companies use a turn-based system where the end results are posted so all the players can see who won the tournament. Other companies take screen recordings of live players and broadcast them to other players at a later point in time to allow players to feel that they are always interacting with another human opponent.

== Distribution ==
Mobile games can be distributed in one of four ways:

- Over the Air (OTA): a game binary file is delivered to the mobile device via wireless carrier networks.
- Sideloaded: a game binary file is loaded onto the phone while connected to a PC, either via USB cable or Bluetooth.
- Pre-installed: a game binary file is preloaded onto the device by the original equipment manufacturer (OEM).
- Mobile browser download: a game file is downloaded directly from a mobile website.

Until the launch of Apple App Store in the US, the majority of mobile games were sold by wireless carriers such as AT&T Mobility, Verizon Wireless, Sprint Corporation, and T-Mobile US. In Europe, games were distributed equally between carriers and off-deck, third-party stores.

After the launch of Apple App Store, the mobile OS platforms like Apple iOS, Google Android, and Microsoft Windows Phone, the mobile OS developers themselves have launched digital download storefronts that can be run on the devices using the OS or from software used on PCs. These storefronts (like Apple's iOS App Store) act as centralized digital download services from which a variety of entertainment media and software can be downloaded, including games and nowadays the majority of games are distributed through them.

The popularity of mobile games has increased throughout the 2000s, as over US$3 billion worth of games were sold internationally in 2007, and the industry is projected to have an annual growth of over 40%. Ownership of a smartphone alone increases the likelihood that a consumer will play mobile games. Over 90% of smartphone users play a mobile game at least once a week.

Many mobile games are distributed free to the end user, but carry paid advertising: examples are Flappy Bird and Doodle Jump. The latter follows the "freemium" model, in which the base game is free but additional items for the game can be purchased separately. Some of the most popular mobile game developers and publishers include Gameloft and King.

== See also ==
- Digital zombie – Person overengaged with digital technology
- iPod game
- Handheld electronic game
- Handheld game console
- Handheld video game
- List of most-played mobile games by player count
- Mobile app
- Mobile gambling
- Mobile development
- N-Gage (device)
- Scalable Network Application Package
- Transreality gaming
