= List of augmented reality video games =

This is a list of augmented reality video games. Most games on this list are mobile games and do not run on AR headsets.

Some games on this list use AR as a passing feature, while others incorporate it as a core part of the gameplay.

AR games do not include Kinect or EyeToy games. Certain gaming devices, such as the EyeToy, PlayStation Eye, Kinect, Nintendo 3DS, PlayStation Portable, PlayStation Vita, Nintendo Switch, and some mobile devices use cameras to augment computer graphics onto live footage, but they are not augmented reality devices as the view is not first-person. The majority of AR software uses special cards which are read by the device to pinpoint where the graphics will form.

== Games ==
- AR Games - a pre-loaded app on the Nintendo 3DS gaming console consisting of numerous AR games.
- Genesis AR TCG - Augmented Reality collectible card game built for iOS and Android (operating system) which allows you to collect trading cards of powerful monsters from across Space and Time. Summon them into an augmented reality arena and use them fight your opponents in a realtime dynamic deathmatch. Combat is similar to a MOBA encounter. Uses simultaneous localization and mapping technology and also features an optional fiduciary marker mode. Released in 2024.
- Bravely Default - Features an AR Movie Mode which recognises a series of AR Cards to display short augmented reality introductions to the playable cast and more.
- Cybergeneration - a table top role-playing game by R. Talsorian, includes "virtuality", an augmented reality created through v-trodes, cheap, widely available devices people wear at their temples.
- Dead Space - a video game in which a RIG worn by Isaac Clarke is thoroughly equipped with augmented reality technology, including a navigation system that projects a line along the best route to his destination, and a system that displays images, video and text in front of him. In conjunction with the game, an augmented-reality website called No Known Survivors was released in 2008.
- E.X. Troopers - a video game with an AR Mode on the Nintendo 3DS version. This recognises AR Cards of characters to display them as well as numerous emotes and attacks when the player presses inputs.
- Five Nights at Freddy's: Special Delivery - a free-to-play spin-off game in the Five Nights at Freddy's franchise, published and developed by Illumix for mobile devices.

Face Raiders: A 2011 3DS game that came preinstalled on all 3ds system, the game used the 3ds camera to create faces for the player to shoot.*Hatsune Miku: Project DIVA F - a video game in which an option named AR Mode allows the console to project Hatsune Miku onto a fiduciary marker. This enables her to sing as an augmented-reality Vocaloid.

- Harry Potter: Wizards Unite (discontinued) - a location-based mobile game developed by Niantic Labs for iOS and Android devices.
- Hydrophobia - a survival-adventure video game from Dark Energy Digital features the MAVI (Mobile Automated Visual Interface), which is a tool used to enhance environmental geometry among other purposes.
- Ingress - a free-to-play location-based, augmented reality game developed by Niantic for iOS and Android devices.
- Invizimals - a Spanish PSP and PSVITA exclusive video game franchise, whose main titles revolved around using augmented reality and special peripherals, to catch the name-shake creatures.
- Jurassic World Alive - a free-to-play location-based, augmented reality game developed by Ludia for iOS and Android devices.
- Let's Hunt Monsters - a China-exclusive, free-to-play augmented reality game published by Tencent for iOS and Android.
- LyteShot - an open source mobile gaming system that uses sensor-based technology to play digital video games, such as first person shooters, in the live action space. It can also use smartglasses for interactive gameplay.
- Mario Kart Live: Home Circuit - videogame for the Nintendo Switch. Allows user to use home setting as a race track. AR is added to deliver elements from the Mario Kart series.
- Monster Hunter Now - a free-to-play location-based, augmented reality game developed by Niantic for iOS and Android devices.
- Peridot - a media franchise from Niantic featuring a variety of augmented reality game experiences, including a location-based mobile game, a mixed reality headset game, and an experience for Snap's AR glasses, Spectacles.
- Pikmin Bloom - a free-to-play location-based, augmented reality game developed by Niantic for iOS and Android devices.
- Pokémon Go - a free-to-play location-based, augmented reality game developed by Niantic for iOS and Android devices.
- Raving Rabbids: Alive & Kicking By Ubisoft Milan
- Spectrek - an augmented reality ghost hunting game.
- Tuttuki Bako - a minigame system from Bandai is described as featuring augmented reality.

== See also ==
- List of augmented reality software
- Geolocation-based video game
