= List of software related to augmented reality =

The following is a list of notable augmented reality software including programs for application development, content management, gaming and integrated AR solutions. For a list specifically for AR video games, see List of augmented reality video games.

== Proprietary ==
Software name	Year of release	Category	Description
MyWebAR.com		End-to-end Web AR solutions	No-code augmented reality platform for creating, managing and publishing augmented reality.
Kivicube	2021	End-to-end Web AR solutions	No-code WebAR platform for creating and publishing augmented reality experiences.
MAXST AR SDK	2010	AR Development Toolkits	
Artivive	2017	AR development tool	No-code Augmented Reality software, helping users create AR projects within seconds.
8th Wall		End-to-end Web AR solutions	
ARCore		AR development toolkits	A Google SDK, currently designed exclusively for Android 8.0+ app creation.
ARKit		AR development toolkits	An Apple SDK, currently designed exclusively for iOS 11+ app creation. Formerly Metaio, purchased by Apple in 2015.
Arti AR		Broadcast Media	Cloud-based AR platform for the broadcast media industry from Israeli-based company Arti.
Augment		AR content management systems	A web based platform for managing 3D models and creating augmented reality experiences.
Aurasma (HP Reveal)	2011	End-to-end branded app solutions	
Blippbuilder		AR content management systems	A web-based system for creating AR experiences with image recognition by Blippar
BUNDLAR	2020	AR content management system	BUNDLAR: No-code augmented reality platform for creating, managing and publishing augmented reality.
echo3D	2018	AR content management systems	3D asset management platform for managing, updating, and streaming 3D/AR/VR content in real-time
Effect House	2022	AR development toolkits	TikTok's AR filter creation tool released from Beta in April 2022.
Genee		End-to-end Web AR solutions	
Hololink	2021	End-to-end Web AR solutions	Web-based editor with Academy and editable templates. Web-based AR viewer based on proprietary image recognition and OpenCV.
Layar SDK		AR development toolkits	An augmented reality SDK for iOS and Android apps.
Lens Studio	2017	AR development toolkits	Snap Inc.'s AR filter creation tool.
Nokia City Lens		End-to-end branded app solutions	
Spark AR Studio	2019	AR development toolkits	AR development tool developed by Meta and used to make Instagram filters. Meta shutdown spark ar studio in Jan 2025
Vuforia Augmented Reality SDK		AR development toolkits	Formerly Qualcomm's QCAR, is a Software Development Kit for creating augmented reality applications for mobile devices.
Web-AR.Studio		AR content management systems	a free web-based system for creating WebAR experiences with image and QR recognition with single and multitracking
Webcam Social Shopper		AR content management systems	Web based software for integrating apparel visualization on e-commerce sites.
Wikitude SDK		AR development toolkits	Augmented reality SDK for mobile platforms originated from the works on the Wikitude World Browser app by Wikitude GmbH.
Zappar		End-to-end Web AR solutions	
zSpace for Education		Education	interaction with 3D objects in lesson plans that align with Common Core
ARmony			Software package to help people to learn an instrument
AR Mixer			app that allows one to select and mix between songs by manipulating real-world objects
Word Lens		Translation tool	
Talk2Me		Social interaction tool for sharing and viewing others' published information in a shared setting	
MAKAR	2018	End-to-end Web AR solutions	No-code AR/VR/MR platform for creating, MAKAR SDK for iOS and Android apps & web
Youtube Effect Maker https://effects.youtube.com/	2024	AR development toolkits	YouTube's AR filter creation tool for creating effects for YouTube Shorts and enabling creators to build interactive AR experiences

== Open source ==
Software name	Year of release	License	Description
A-Frame (virtual reality framework)	2015	MIT	A framework that adds HTML tags for most of the functionality in three.js and other JavaScript features as a superset of this lower level underlying 3-D framework.
ApertusVR	2016	MIT	An embeddable, open-source, framework-independent, platform-independent, network-topology-independent, distributed AR /VR/MR engine. Written in C++; with JavaScript and HTTP Rest API (in Node.js). It creates a new abstraction layer over the hardware vendors in order to integrate the virtual and augmented reality technologies into any developments and products.
ARToolKit		LGPLv3	An open source C-library to create augmented reality applications; was ported to many different languages and platforms like Android, Flash or Silverlight; very widely used in augmented reality related projects.
OpenIllusionist			Provides software libraries for generating images, interpreting user input, modelling the behaviour of virtual objects (or 'agents'), and threading all of the above to provide the illusion of reality.
AR.js		MIT	A library to allow development of marker-based, Natural Feature Tracking and location-based AR applications on the web. It can be used in conjunction with A-Frame (virtual reality framework) or three.js
MindAR	2021	MIT	A library to allow development of image-tracking and face-tracking types of AR applications on the web. It can be used in conjunction with A-Frame or three.js.

== See also ==
- Fyuse
