= Tokyo Tower =

Communications and observation tower in Japan

- 東京タワー

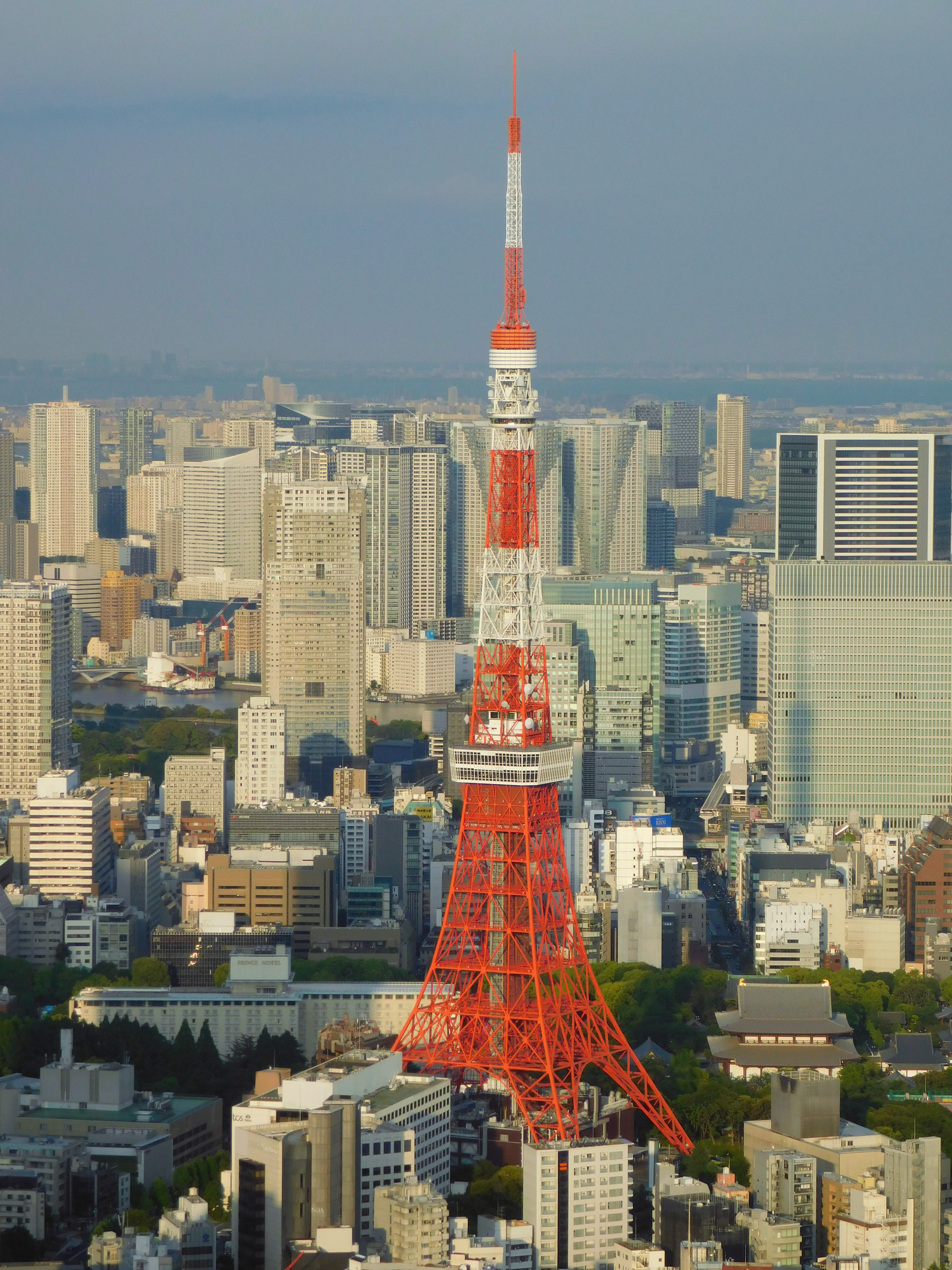
- Tokyo Tower in 2023

General information
- Status: Completed
- Type: Communications tower Observation tower
- Location: 4-2-8 Shiba-koen, Minato, Tokyo 105-0011
- Coordinates: 35°39′31″N 139°44′44″E
- Construction started: June 1957; 69 years ago
- Topped-out: 14 October 1958; 68 years ago
- Completed: 1958; 68 years ago
- Opening: 23 December 1958; 67 years ago
- Cost: ¥2.8 billion (US$8.4 million in 1958)
- Owner: The Tokyo Tower Company (controlling shareholder: Toei Company and Mother Farm)

Height
- Architectural: 333 m (1,093 ft)
- Antenna spire: 332.9 m (1,092 ft)
- Top floor: 249.6 m (819 ft)
- Observatory: 249.6 m (819 ft)

Technical details
- Floor count: 15
- Lifts/elevators: 4

Design and construction
- Architect: Tachū Naitō
- Structural engineer: Nikken Sekkei Ltd.
- Main contractor: Takenaka Corporation

Website
- en.tokyotower.co.jp

Tokyo Tower (東京タワー, Tōkyō Tawā; pronounced [toːkʲoː taꜜɰᵝaː]), also known by its official name Japan Radio Tower (日本電波塔, Nippon denpatō) is a communications and observation tower in the district of Shiba-koen in Minato, Tokyo, Japan, completed in 1958. At 332.9 meters (1,092 feet), it was the tallest tower in Japan until the construction of Tokyo Skytree in 2012. It is a lattice tower inspired by the Eiffel Tower, and is painted white and international orange to comply with air safety regulations.

The tower's main sources of income are antenna leasing and tourism, and its five-story base building FootTown houses a number of restaurants, gift shops, and other attractions. Departing from it, guests can visit two observation decks: the two-story Main Deck at 150 m (490 ft), and the smaller Top Deck at 249.6 m (819 ft). The tower is repainted every five years, the process itself taking a year to complete.

In 1961, transmission antennas were added. They are used for radio and television broadcasting and now broadcast signals for media outlets such as NHK, TBS Television, and Fuji Television. The height of the tower was not suitable for Japan's planned terrestrial digital broadcasting planned for July 2011, and for the Tokyo area. A taller digital broadcasting tower, known as Tokyo Skytree, was completed on 29 February 2012. Tokyo Tower has become a prominent landmark and frequently appears in media set in Tokyo.

== Construction ==
Construction underway on 25 February 1958

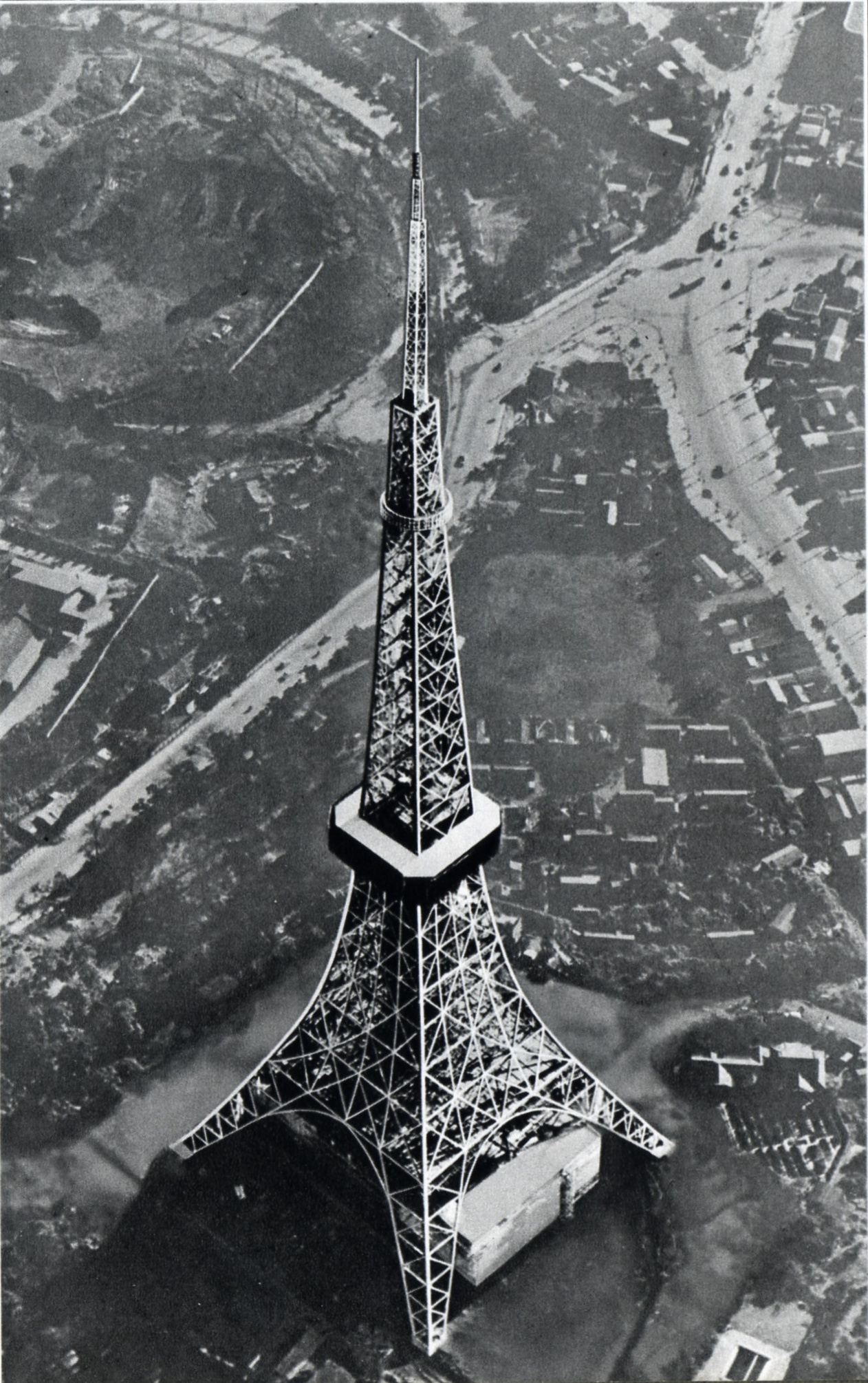
Tokyo Tower around 1961

A large broadcasting tower was needed in the Kantō region after NHK, Japan's public broadcasting station, began television broadcasting in 1953. Private broadcasting companies began operating in the months following the construction of NHK's own transmission tower. This communications boom led the Japanese government to believe that transmission towers would soon be built all over Tokyo, eventually overrunning the city. The proposed solution was the construction of one large tower capable of transmitting to the entire region. Furthermore, because of the country's postwar boom in the 1950s, Japan was searching for a monument to symbolize its national recovery from World War II, as one of the countries most ravaged by the war.

Hisakichi Maeda, founder and president of Nippon Denpatō, the tower's owner and operator, originally planned for the tower to be taller than the Empire State Building, which at 381 m (1,250 ft) was the highest structure in the world at the time. However, the plan fell through because of the lack of both funds and materials. The tower's height was eventually determined by the distance the TV stations needed to transmit throughout the Kantō region, a distance of about 150 kilometers (93 miles).

Tachū Naitō, designer of tall buildings in Japan, was chosen to design the newly proposed tower. Looking to the Western world for inspiration, Naitō based his design on the Eiffel Tower in Paris, France. With the help of engineering company Nikken Sekkei Ltd., Naitō claimed his design could withstand earthquakes with twice the intensity of the 1923 Great Kantō earthquake or typhoons with wind speeds of up to 220 km/h (140 mph).

The new construction project attracted hundreds of tobi (鳶), traditional Japanese construction workers who specialized in the construction of high-rise structures. The Takenaka Corporation broke ground in June 1957 and each day at least 400 laborers worked on the tower. It was constructed of steel, a third of which was scrap metal taken from US tanks damaged in the Korean War. When the 90-meter (300 ft)-long antenna was bolted into place on 14 October 1958, Tokyo Tower was the tallest freestanding tower in the world, taking the title from the Eiffel Tower by 9 m (30 ft).

Though physically taller than the Eiffel Tower, Tokyo Tower weighs about 4,000 tons, 3,300 less than the Eiffel Tower as it is significantly thinner and simpler in construction. It was opened to the public on 23 December 1958 at a final cost of ¥2.8 billion ($8.4 million in 1958). Tokyo Tower was mortgaged for ¥10 billion in 2000. It was the tallest artificial structure in Japan until April 2012, when it was surpassed by the Tokyo Skytree.

Planned as an antenna for telecommunications and brightly colored in accordance with the time's Aviation Law, the tower's two panoramic observatories are mostly frequented by tourists today. The tower constitutes a clear reference point in the city's skyline, forming a strong landmark, both night and day. The tower is periodically repainted in a process that takes about a year to complete. This traditionally occurred every five years, but the latest painting in 2019 utilized a new, more durable coating that extended the official timetable to seven years, projecting the next painting for 2026.

== Functions ==
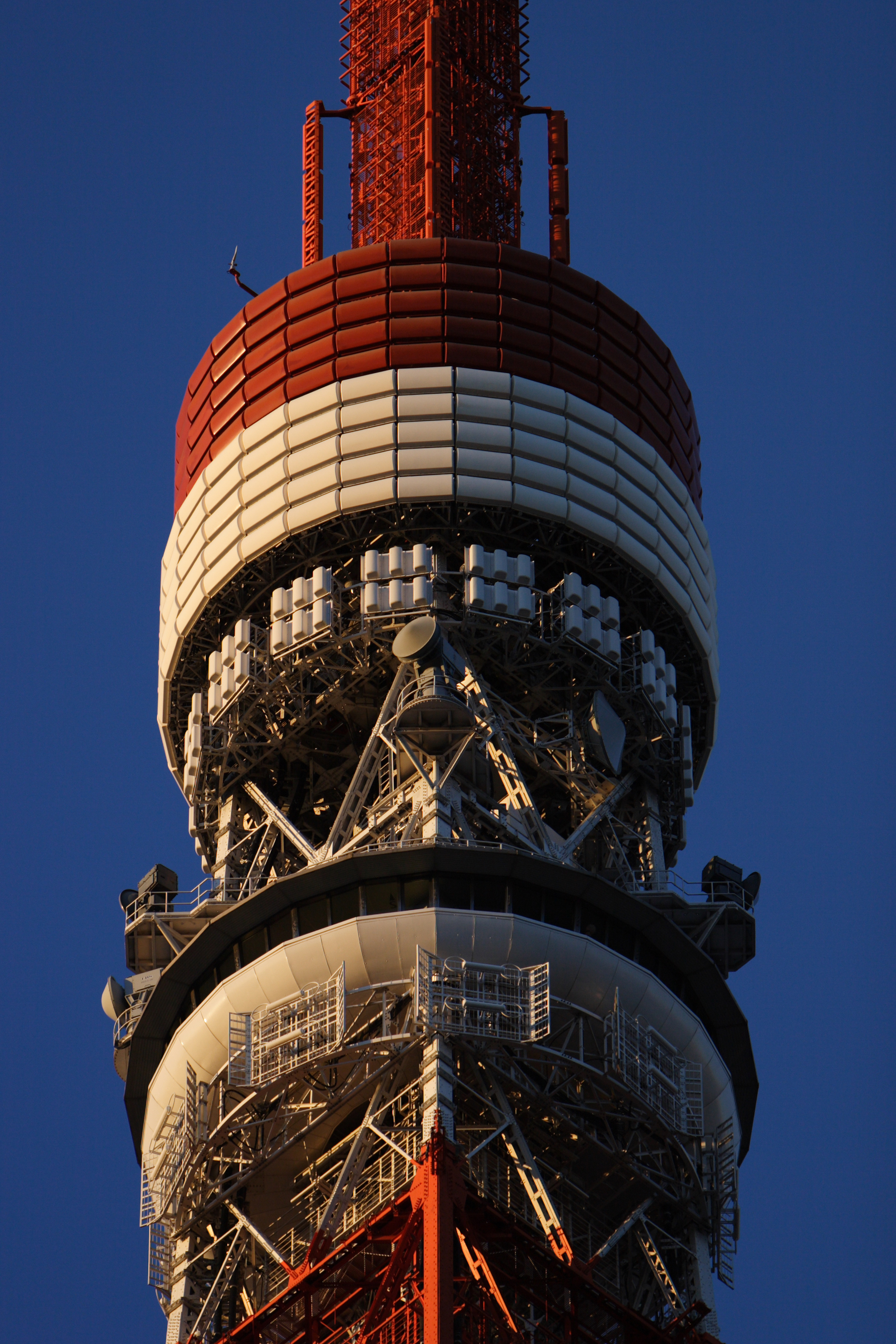
The Top Deck, located directly below the digital television broadcasting equipment

Tokyo Tower's two main revenue sources are antenna leasing and tourism. It functions as a radio and television broadcasting antenna support structure and is a tourist destination that houses a variety of attractions. The tower recorded its 190 millionth visitor in 2024. Previously, visitor numbers had steadily declined in the 1990s, bottoming out at 2.3 million in 2000 before rising again.

The first area tourists visit upon reaching the tower is FootTown, a five-story building stationed directly at the base. There, visitors can eat, shop, and enjoy various novelties and attractions. Elevators that depart from the first floor of FootTown can be used to reach the first of two observation decks, the two-story Main Observatory. For the price of another ticket, visitors can board another set of elevators from the second floor of the Main Observatory to reach the final observation deck—the Special Observatory. The names were changed following renovation of the top deck in 2018.

=== Broadcasting ===
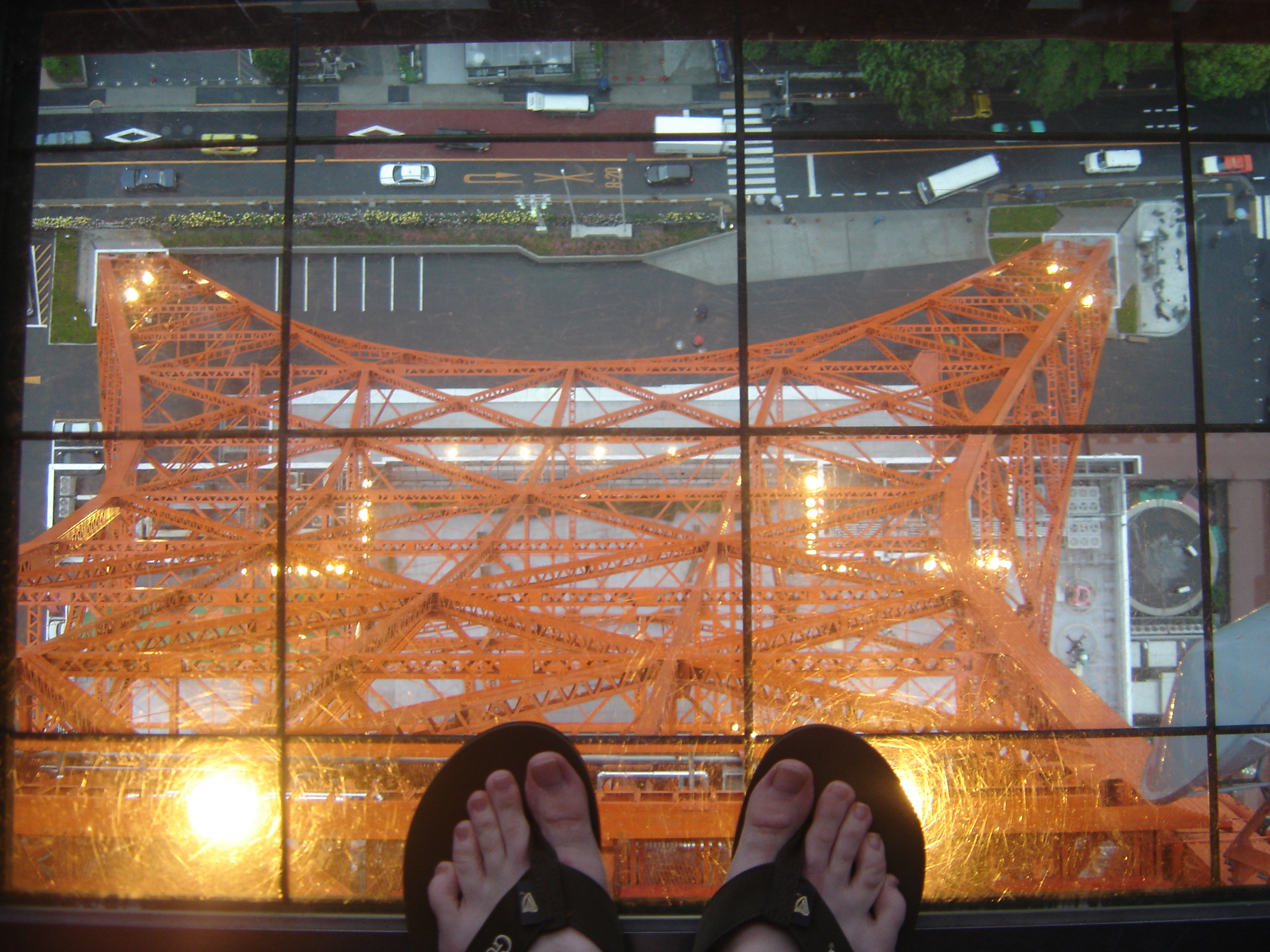
Looking down from the glass flooring

Tokyo Tower, a member of the World Federation of Great Towers, has been used by many organizations for broadcasting purposes. The structure was intended for broadcasting television, but radio antennas were installed in 1961 because it could accommodate them. While analog and digital television broadcasts are no longer conducted from the site, two FM radio stations remain on Tokyo Tower. Stations that use or have used the tower's antenna include:

==== Current ====
- Tokyo FM (JOAU-FM): 80.0 MHz
- InterFM (JODW-FM): 89.7 MHz

==== Former ====
- NHK General TV Tokyo (JOAK-TV): VHF Channel 1 (Analog)
- NHK Educational TV Tokyo (JOAB-TV): VHF Channel 3 (Analog)
- Nippon Television Tokyo (JOAX-TV): VHF Channel 4 (Analog)
- Tokyo Broadcasting System Television (JORX-TV): TBS Television/VHF Channel 6 (Analog)
- Fuji Television Tokyo (JOCX-TV): Fuji Television Analog/VHF Channel 8 (Analog)
- TV Asahi Tokyo (JOEX-TV): TV Asahi Analog Television/VHF Channel 10 (Analog)
- TV Tokyo (JOTX-TV): VHF Channel 12 (Analog)
- Tokyo Metropolitan Television (JOMX-TV): UHF Channel 14 (Analog)
- The University of the Air TV (JOUD-TV): UHF Channel 16 (Analog)
- tvk (JOKM-TV): UHF Channel 42 (Analog)
- The University of the Air-FM (JOUD-FM): 77.1 MHz
- J-Wave (JOAV-FM): 81.3 MHz
- NHK Radio FM Tokyo (JOAK-FM): 82.5 MHz

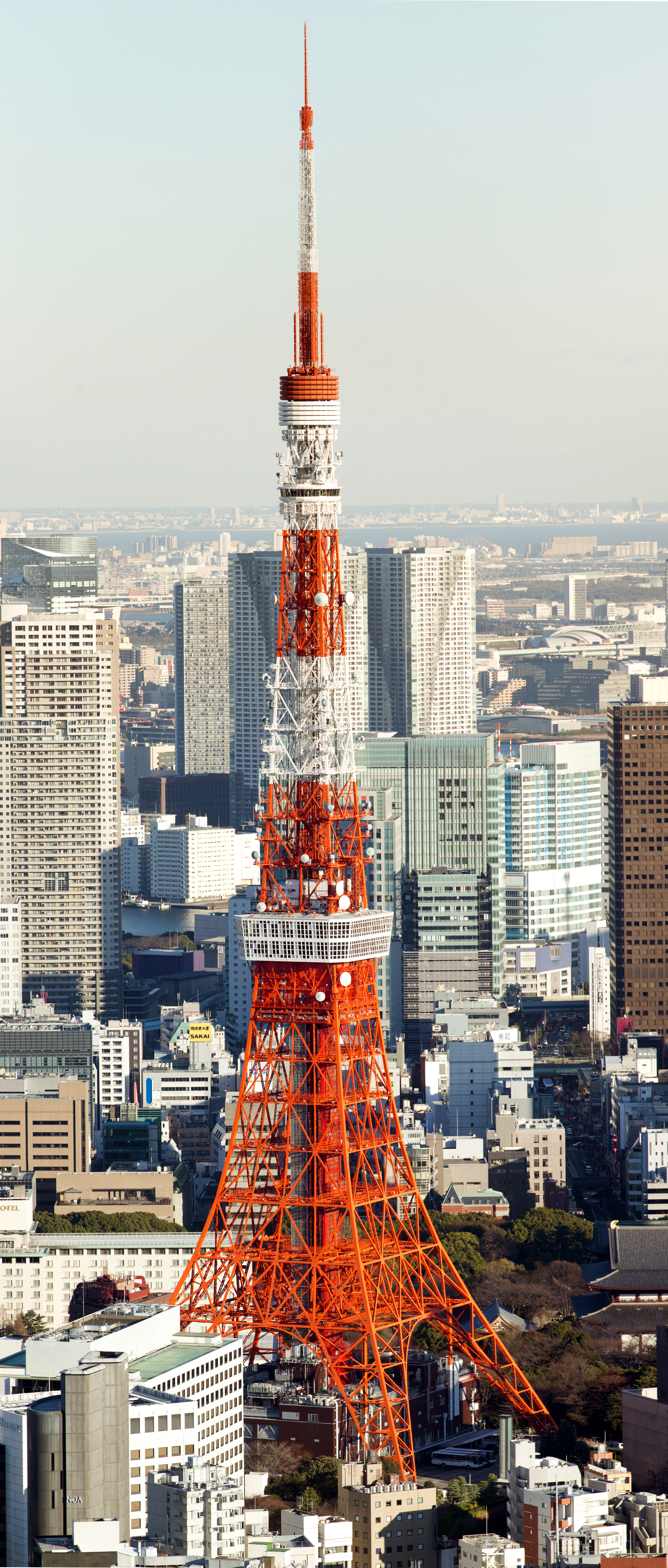
Tokyo Tower, built in 1958

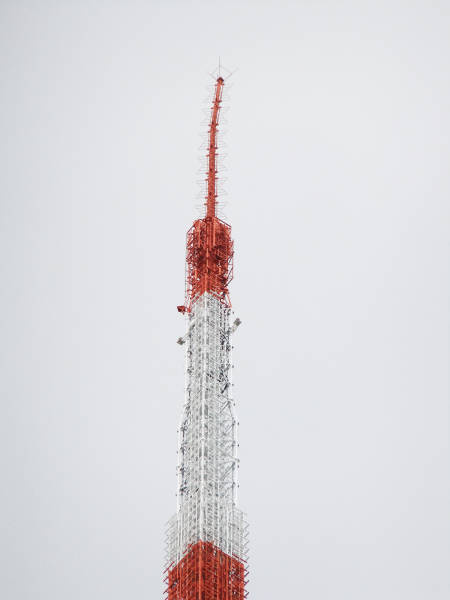
The 2011 Tōhoku earthquake did slight damage to the antenna of Tokyo Tower.

Japan employs both analog and digital broadcasting. In July 2011 all television broadcasting was changed to solely digital. Tokyo Tower is not a reliable broadcasting antenna for completely digital broadcasting because the tower is not tall enough to transmit the higher frequency waves to areas surrounded by forests or high-rise buildings. As an alternative, a new 634-meter-tall (2,100 ft) tower, the Tokyo Skytree, was opened in 2012. In an attempt to make Tokyo Tower more appealing to NHK and the five other commercial broadcasters who planned to move their transmitting stations to the new tower, Nihon Denpatō officials drafted a plan to extend its digital broadcasting antenna by 80 to 100 m (260 to 330 ft) at a cost of approximately ¥4 billion (US$50 million).

As a result of their move to the Skytree, only one digital television station remained on Tokyo Tower: that of the Open University of Japan, whose JOUD-DTV and JOUD-FM continued on the tower until shutting down in 2018. FM radio stations will continue to use the tower for broadcasting in the Tokyo area. Masahiro Kawada, the tower's planning director, raised the possibility of the tower becoming a backup for the Tokyo Skytree, depending on what the TV broadcasters want or need.

The antenna's tip was damaged on 11 March 2011 by the Tōhoku earthquake. On 19 July 2012, Tokyo Tower's height shrank to 315 meters while the top antenna was repaired for damage from the earthquake.

=== Attractions ===
As tourism was always one of the tower's intended purposes, its five-story base building opened with a number of attractions in addition to housing elevators for the tower proper. The building was initially advertised as a "modern science museum," with the lower two floors focused on shops and restaurants, and the third and fourth on showrooms for the latest technologies from various electronics and broadcast companies (the fifth was closed to the public, being used to house heavy transmission equipment).

With public interests shifting over time, attractions have constantly been renovated or rotated out for new ones, among the more notable:

- A wax museum on the third floor in 1970, advertised as Japan's first, displaying London-made figures of Leonardo and The Last Supper, John F. Kennedy, Chiune Sugihara, The Beatles, and more (closed 2013).
- An aquarium on the first floor in 1978, offering many exotic fish for both display and sale (closed 2018).
- A "trick art" gallery on the fourth floor in 1994, dedicated to various forms of Trompe-l'œil and other optical illusion art (closed 2012).

The building's roof leads to the tower's outside stairwell, comprising approximately 660 steps up to the Main Deck; on weekends and holidays only, visitors may use these stairs as an alternative to the tower's internal elevators (for the same entry fare) and earn a certificate for completing the climb. For many years, the roof also held a small playground that offered several simple rides and old-fashioned arcade games, and hosted live performances for children.

==== FootTown ====
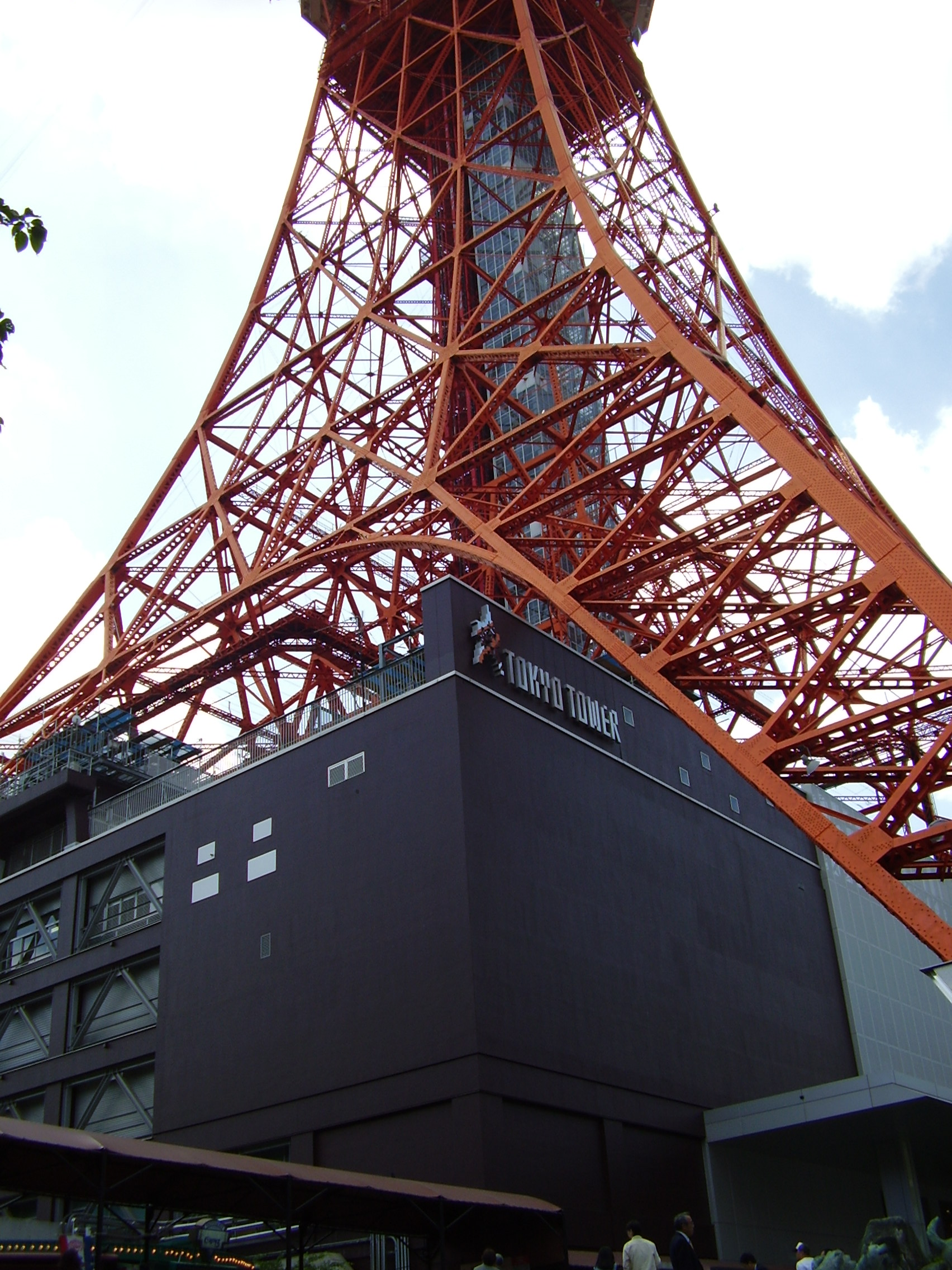
The base of Tokyo Tower with the FootTown building located underneath

In 2005, the base building was heavily renovated and renamed FootTown. While a few historical mainstays such as the Tower Restaurant, aquarium, wax museum and trick art gallery survived for a time, many new tenants were added, including a FamilyMart convenience store on the first floor and a Guinness World Records museum and hologram gallery named Gallery DeLux on the third floor. The second-floor food court was also heavily reorganized, and many of the older souvenir shops consolidated into a single area called Tokyo Omiyage Town.

The rooftop playground was also initially retained, albeit incorporated into a larger area known as the "Glass Plaza" meant to better accommodate live performances and FootTown's seasonal beer gardens. In late 2013 the playground was quietly removed; since then, the roof space has continued to host expanded beer (and highball) gardens as well as a pickleball court.

As of 2026, FootTown's current major tenants include MOS Burger, Baskin-Robbins, Lawson S, and Pizza-La in addition to RED° (see below). Galleries and murals dedicated to the tower's history may also be found on the first and third floors.

===== Tokyo One Piece Tower =====
In 2015, FootTown launched an indoor amusement park based on Eiichiro Oda's hit manga/anime series One Piece. It hosted a range of attractions, shops, and restaurants, offering patrons exclusive games, merchandise, and live performances themed to the fictional world and its characters.

In 2020, due to concerns over the COVID-19 pandemic, the park was temporarily, then permanently closed down. However, several of its attendant renovations, including FootTown's first escalators and a publicly-open fifth floor (the transmission equipment having been relocated to the Skytree) remained.

===== RED° Tokyo Tower =====
In 2022, One Piece Tower's former facilities were renovated into RED° Tokyo Tower, a multi-story arcade dedicated to VR and AR games. Currently billed as Japan's largest esports park, it occupies roughly one-third of FootTown's first and third floors, and the entirety of the floors above.

=== Observatories ===
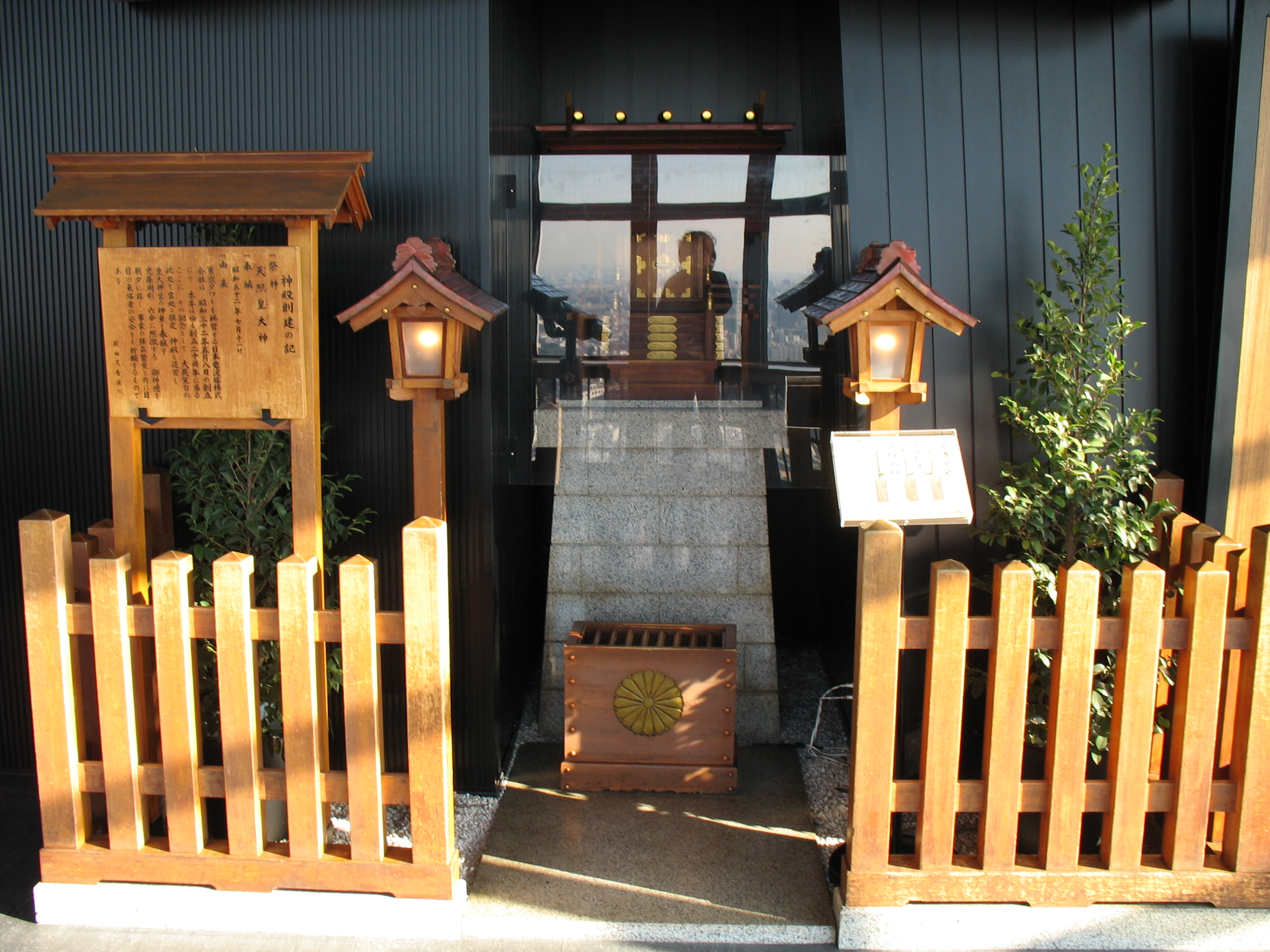
Daijingu Shrine, on the second floor of the Main Deck

Separate from FootTown, the tower's observatories host their own shops and attractions. In particular, the two-story main deck contains a café, a private lounge.

=== Tower Daijingu ===
Tower Daijingu (also called Great Shinto Shrine of the Tower) is a small shrine dedicated to Amaterasu Omikami, reputed to be the highest shrine in central Tokyo. When it was built, it was imbued with the spirit of Amaterasu Omikami from Ise Jingu (thus, making it a Daijingu).

The shrine was opened on 11 July 1977 on the 20th anniversary of the TOKYO TOWER Co., Ltd. to offer prayers for the success of the company and the tower's broadcasters and for the safety of tower visitors. It would later be renovated on 23 December 2008 along with the rest of the tower to celebrate the 50th anniversary of the tower, and again fully renovated in July 2019 along with most of the observation deck.

The shrine offers unique Shuin(Seal stamp), Ema(Votive tablets), and Omamori(Good-luck charms) to its visitors, with images depicting the Tokyo Tower. The Shuins are available to all visitors of the shrine, though some limited-time only versions are only available in special occasions. The Ema's wood comes from forest thinning as a part of the conservation effort for the forest of Kochi Prefecture. All the Emas along with their stand are purified by the chief priest of Sawai Inari Shrine. They are believed to grant success in love and school exams. The shrine offers a wide variety of Omamori including charms for traffic safety, economic fortune, academic success, matchmaking, and general good luck. The Omamoris from this shrine are specifically associated with victory and getting high marks on exams due to the shrine's elevation, and matchmaking due to the tower's popularity for marriage proposals, with beliefs that lovers who are at the tower when the lights go out will be eternally happy.

Every year in May, an annual festival will be held in the Tower Daijingu by the Sawai Inari Shrine, involving ceremonial prayers for construction related safety.

== Appearance ==
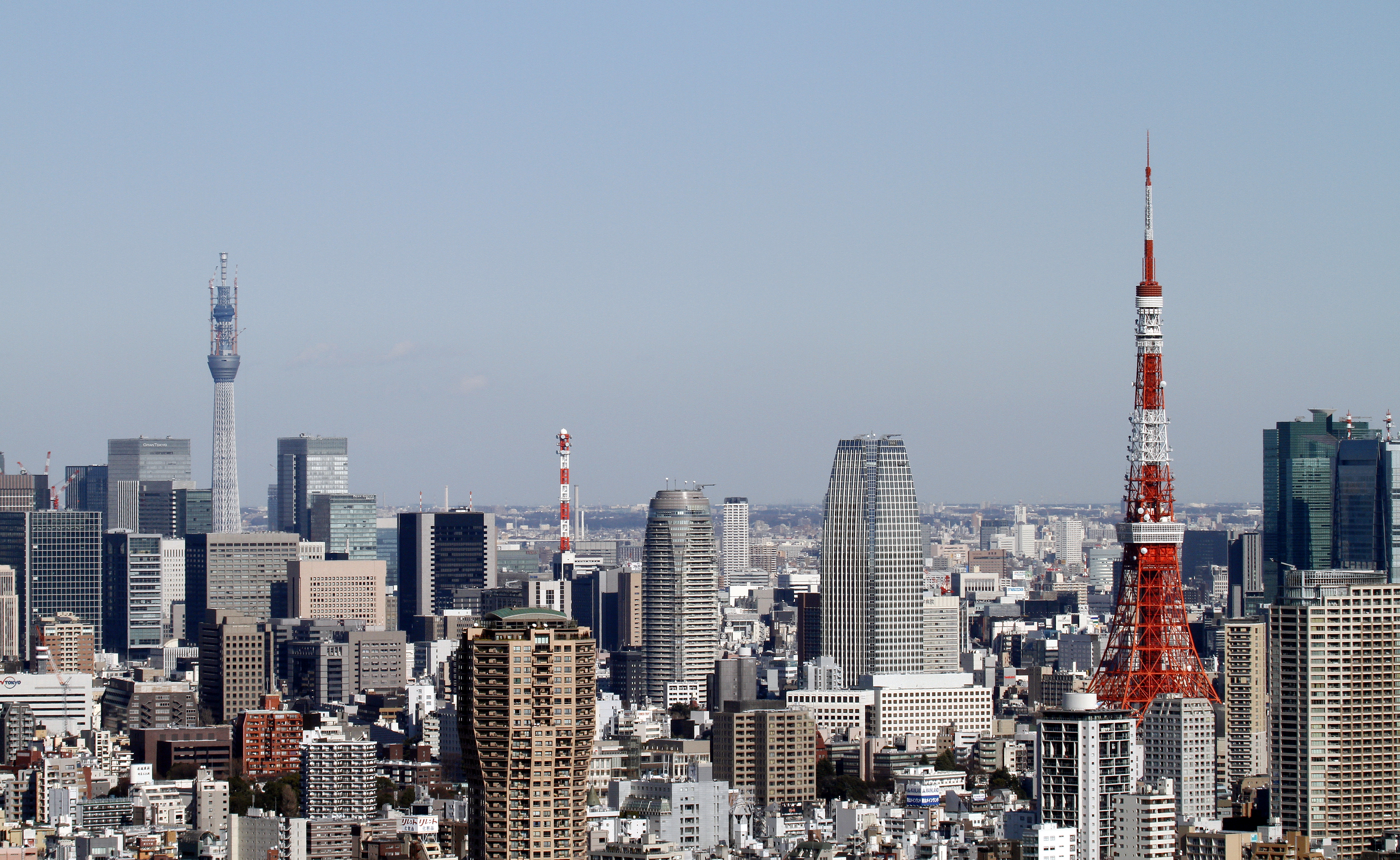
Tokyo Tower in January 2011 with the Tokyo Skytree under construction in the background

Tokyo Tower requires 28,000 litres (7,400 US gallons) of paint to completely paint the structure white and international orange, complying with air safety regulations. Before the tower's 30th anniversary in 1987, the only lighting on the tower were light bulbs located on the corner contours that extended from the base to the antenna. In the spring of 1987, Nihon Denpatō invited lighting designer Motoko Ishii to visit the tower. Since its opening 30 years earlier, the tower's annual ticket sales had dropped significantly, and in a bid to revitalize the tower and again establish it as an important tourist attraction and symbol of Tokyo, Ishii was hired to redesign Tokyo Tower's lighting arrangement.

Unveiled in 1989, the new lighting arrangement required the removal of the contour-outlining light bulbs and the installation of 176 floodlights in and around the tower's frame. From dusk to midnight, the floodlights illuminate the entire tower. Sodium vapor lamps are used from 2 October to 6 July to cover the tower in an orange color. From 7 July to 1 October, the lights are changed to metal halide lamps to illuminate the tower with a white color. The reasoning behind the change is a seasonal one. Ishii reasoned that orange is a warmer color and helps to offset the cold winter months. Conversely, white is thought a cool color that helps during the hot summer months.

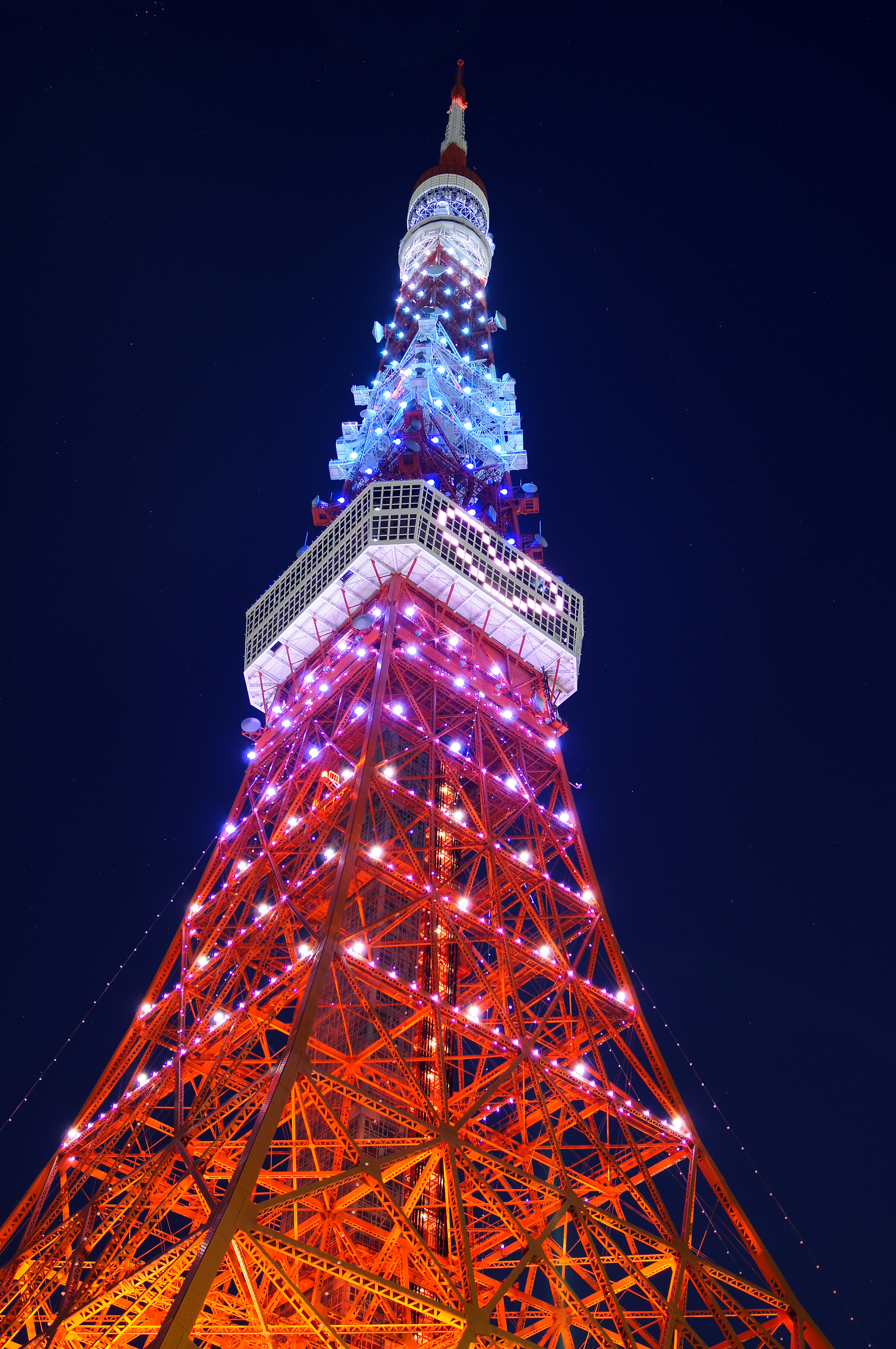
"Christmas Light Down Story", 2010

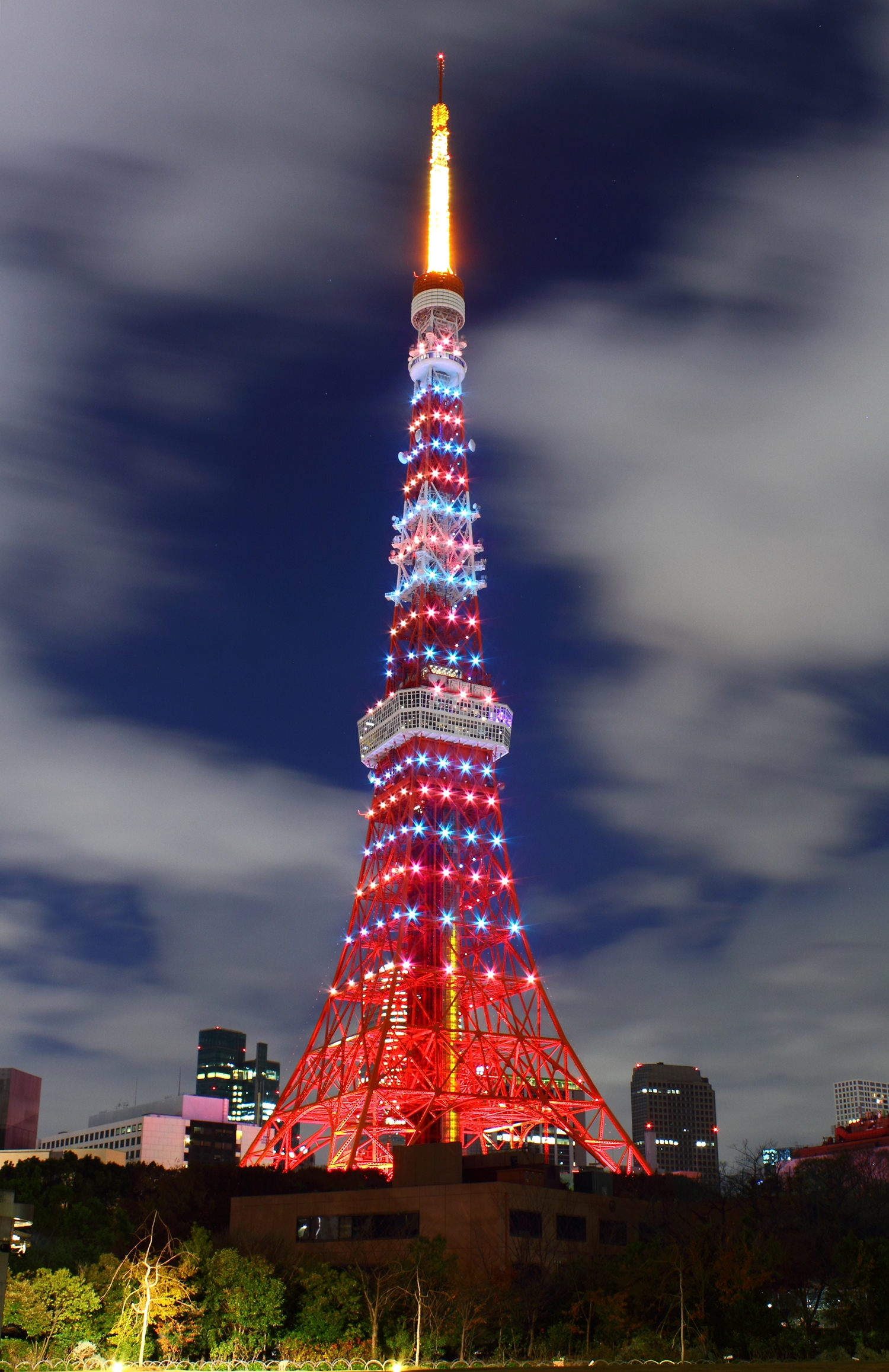
"Diamond Veil" lighting

Occasionally, Tokyo Tower's lighting is changed to specific arrangements for special events. The tower is specially lit for some annual events. Since 2000, the entire tower has been illuminated in a pink light on 1 October to highlight the beginning of National Breast Cancer Awareness Month. The tower has also had a variety of special lighting arrangements for Christmas since 1994. During New Year's Eve, the tower lights up at midnight with a year number displayed on one side of the observatory to mark the arrival of the new year.

Special Japanese events have been cause to light the tower in several non-traditional ways. In 2002, alternating sections of the tower were lit blue to help celebrate the opening of the FIFA World Cup in Japan. Alternating sections of the tower were lit green on Saint Patrick's Day in 2007 to commemorate the 50th anniversary of Japanese–Irish relations. On a few occasions, Tokyo Tower has even been specially lit to correspond with corporate events. For example, the top half of the tower was lit green to correspond with the Japanese premiere of The Matrix Reloaded and different sections of the tower were lit red, white and black to commemorate the first day of sales of Coca-Cola C2. In the summer of 2021, the tower was lit up in Olympic colors to celebrate the 2020 Summer Olympics and 2020 Summer Paralympics in Tokyo, both of which had been delayed a year due to the COVID-19 pandemic. On 18 November 2021, the tower was lit up at 17:17 in the red of Major League Baseball's Los Angeles Angels following the awarding of the American League MVP to two-way player Shohei Ohtani.

The tower was lit for the new millennium in 2000 with Motoko Ishii again reprising her role as the designer. In December 2008, Nihon Denpatō spent $6.5 million to create a new night-time illumination scheme—titled the "Diamond Veil"—to celebrate the tower's 50th anniversary. The arrangement featured 276 lights in seven colors equally distributed across the towers four faces.

When employing specialty lighting on the tower, the Main Observatory often plays an important role. During the second international "White Band Day" on 10 September 2005, the tower was completely unlit except for the Main Observatory, which was lit with a bright white light. The resulting white ring represented the White Band referenced in the day's name. The two floors of windows that make up the exterior of the Main Observatory are utilized to display words or numbers. When the tower employed lighting to commemorate terrestrial digital broadcasting first being available in the Kantō region on 1 December 2005, each side of the Main Observatory displayed the characters 地デジ (chi deji, an abbreviation for 地上デジタル放送 chijō dejitaru hōsō terrestrial digital broadcasting). More recently, the observatory displayed both "TOKYO" and "2016" to stress Tokyo's 2016 Olympic bid. Primitive images, such as hearts, have also been displayed using the observatory's windows.

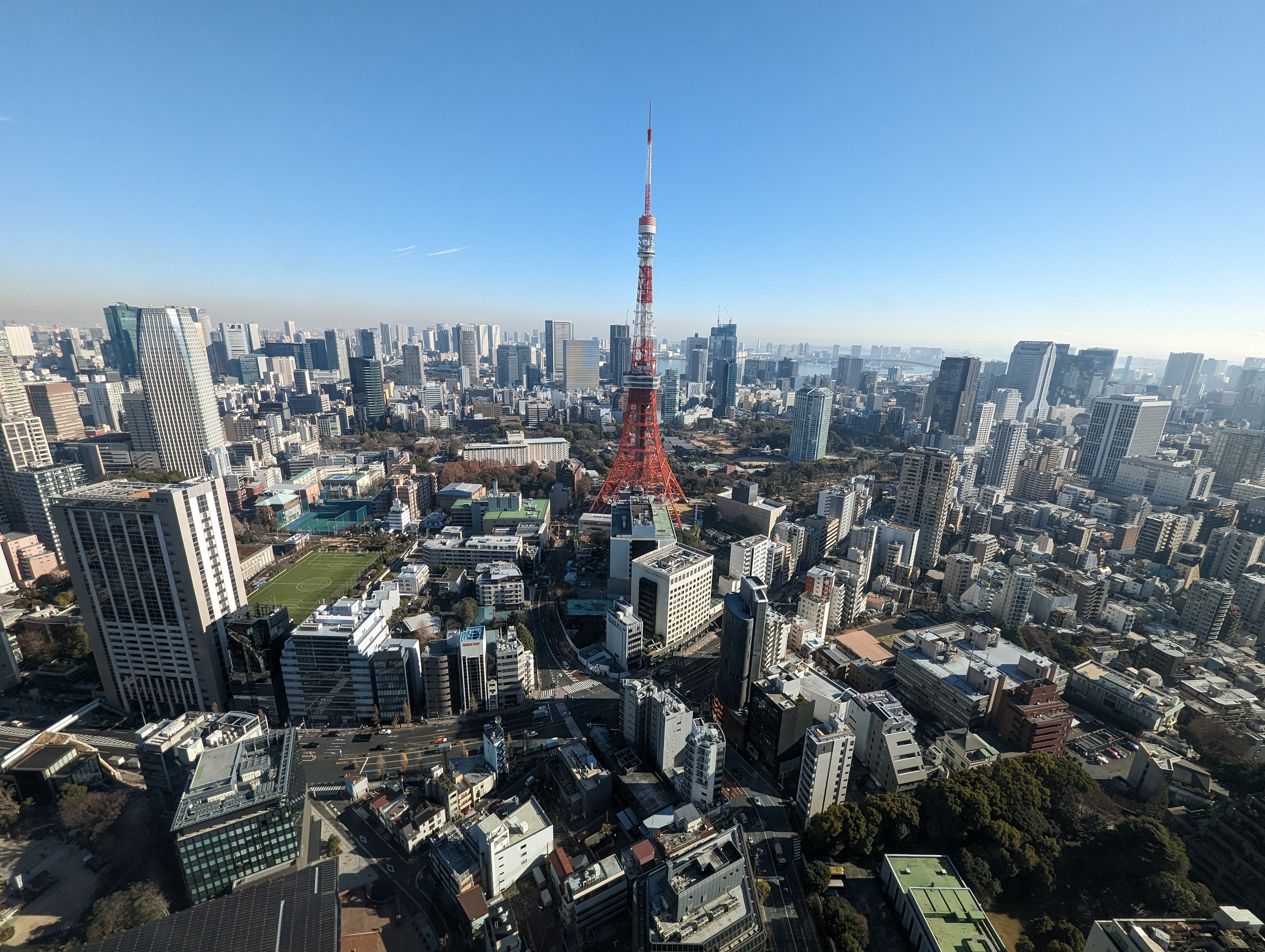
Tokyo Tower seen from the 33rd floor of Azabudai Hills JP Tower

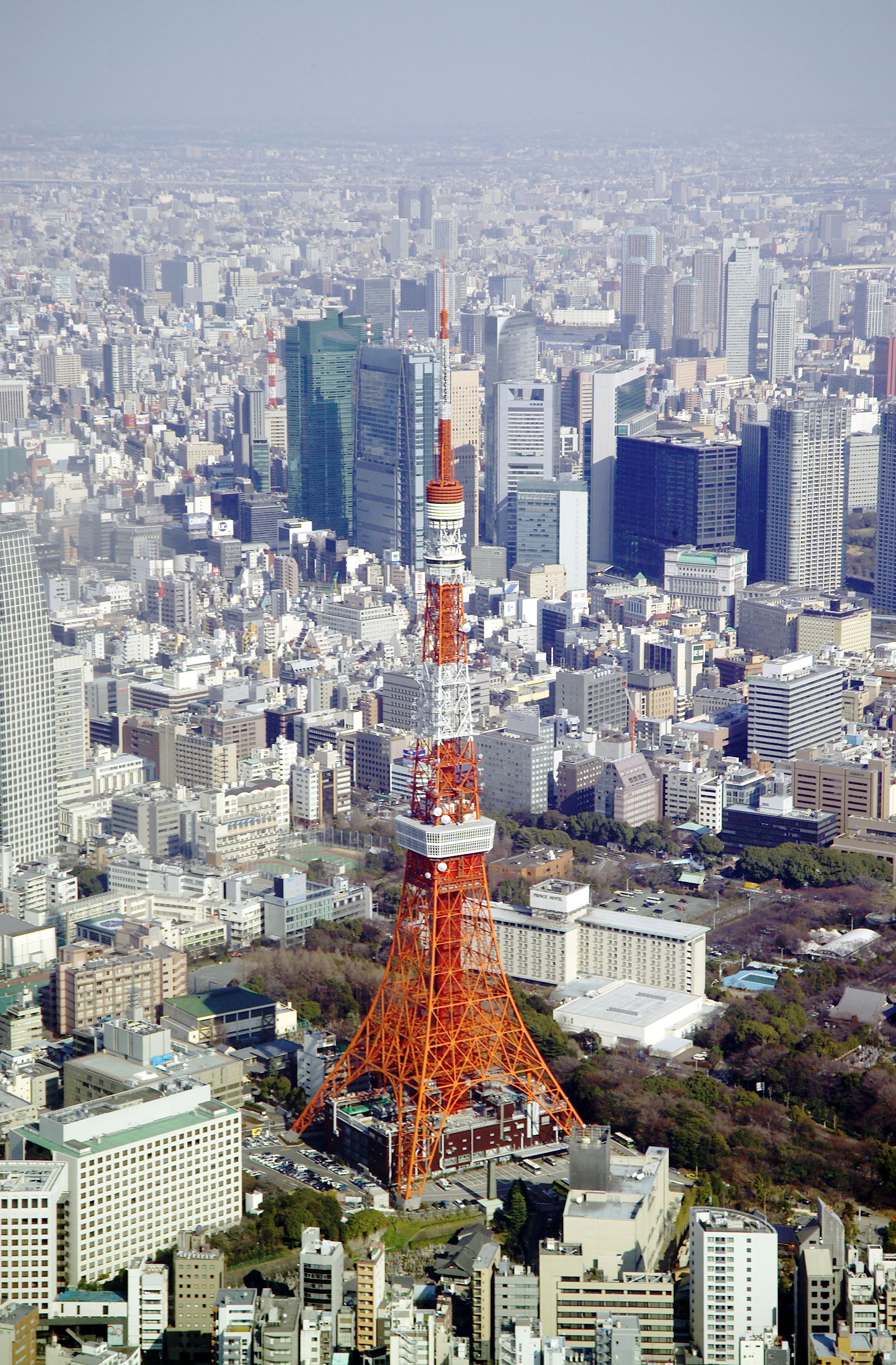
Tokyo Tower, with Shiodome in the background

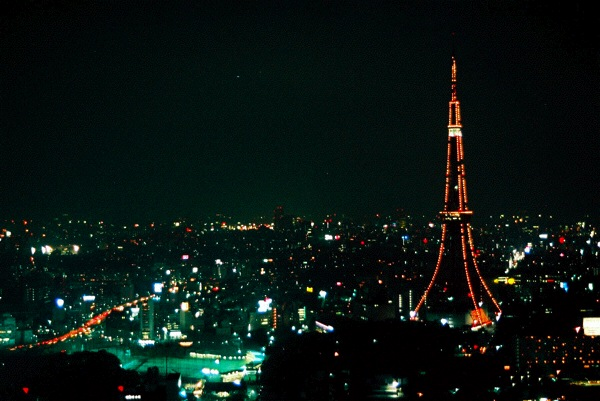
The tower's original lighting arrangement, used until 1989

== Renovation ==
Operations at the Tokyo Tower Top Deck (at the height of 250 m) were suspended in 2016. The Top Deck reopened on 3 March 2018. At that time, Tokyo Tower also announced the renaming of both decks. Renovations on the main deck, which began in September 2016, caused partial closure of the deck.

== Mascots ==
Tokyo Tower has two mascots named Noppon (ノッポン). They are two brothers: Older Brother, who wears blue dungarees, and Younger Brother, who wears red dungarees. They were unveiled on 23 December 1998 to celebrate the 40th anniversary of Tokyo Tower.

== Media representation ==
Motion around Tokyo Tower at night, 2019

Just as the Eiffel Tower is often used in popular culture to immediately locate a scene in Paris, Tokyo Tower is often used in the same way for Tokyo. It is used in anime and manga such as Doraemon, Tokyo Magnitude 8.0, Magic Knight Rayearth, Please Save My Earth, Cardcaptor Sakura, Digimon, Detective Conan, Sailor Moon, Tenchi Muyo!, Sakamoto Days and Death Note. The tower is frequently used in the Japanese kaiju (giant monster) film genre. It has been the location of numerous battles and visitations by Godzilla, Mothra, Gamera and King Kong (King Kong Escapes) wherein it is frequently destroyed and rebuilt.

Tokyo Tower is represented in Unicode as an emoji at code point U+1F5FC: 🗼

Tokyo Tower and its construction often appears in Shōwa nostalgia fiction and non-fiction, where it is used as a symbol of the financial prosperity of Shōwa era Japan. For example, the 2005 film Always Sanchōme no Yūhi, based on the popular manga series by Ryōhei Saigan, was a nostalgic view of life in the neighborhoods beneath the construction of Tokyo Tower.

== Gallery ==
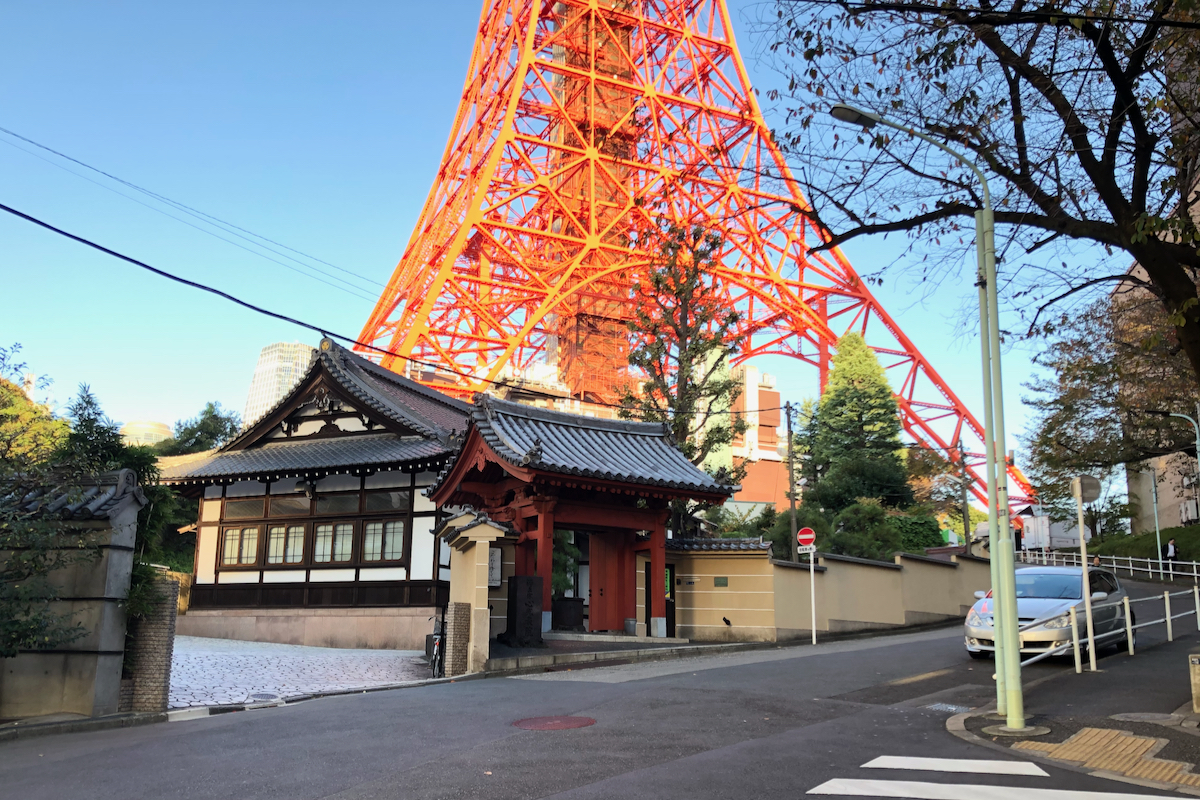
Shinkōin and the base of Tokyo Tower

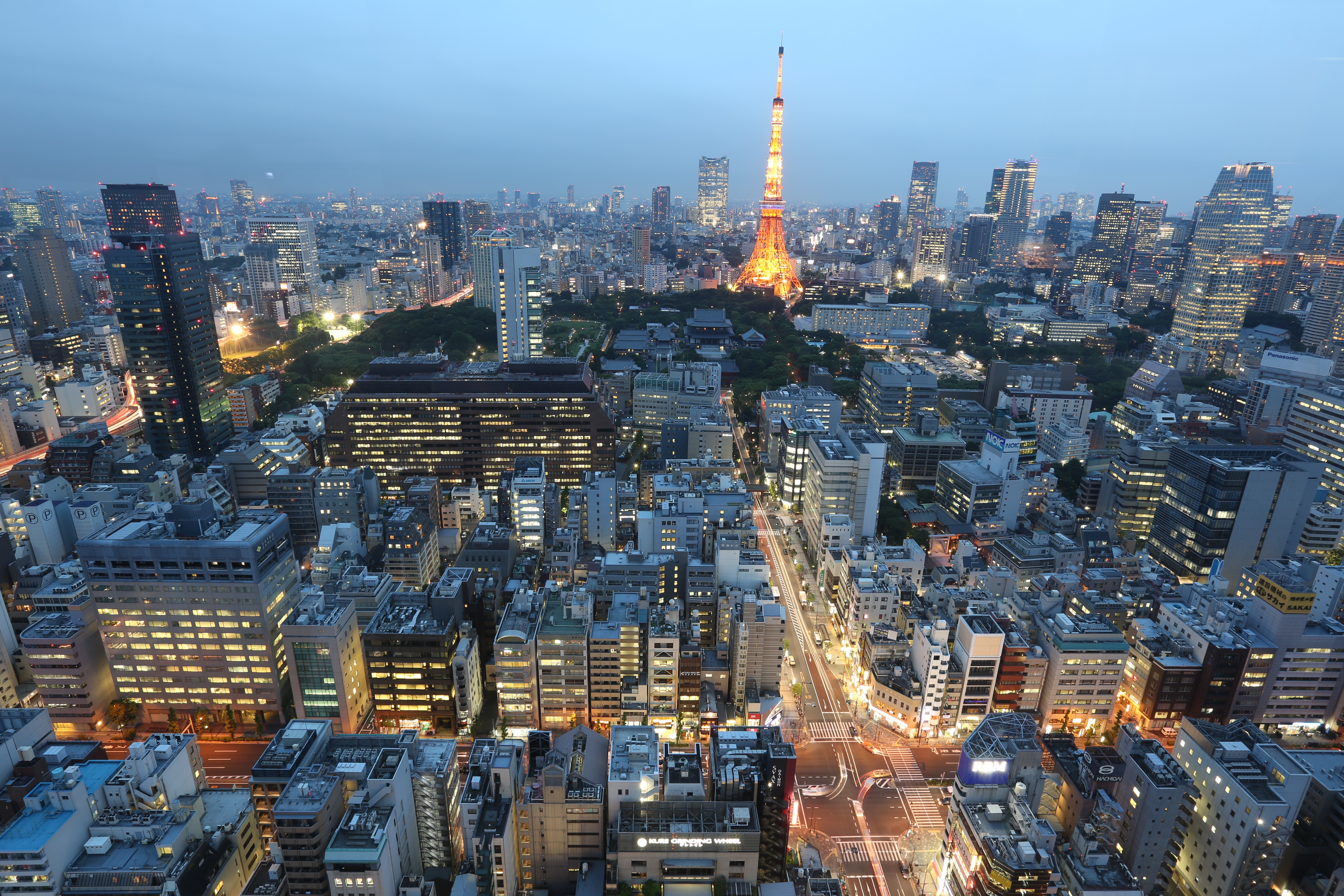
Aerial view on Shiba-koen at dusk

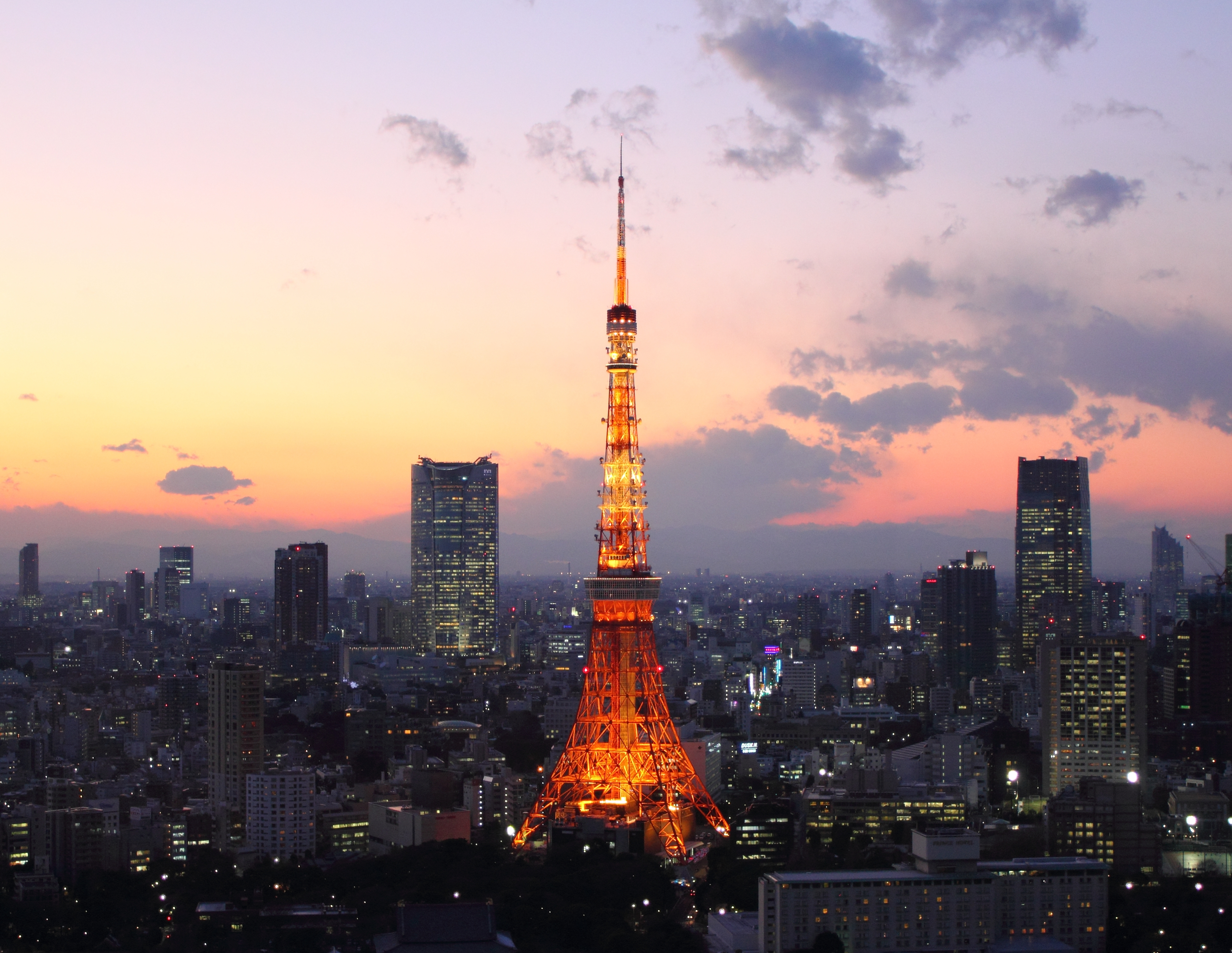
Tokyo Tower at sunset

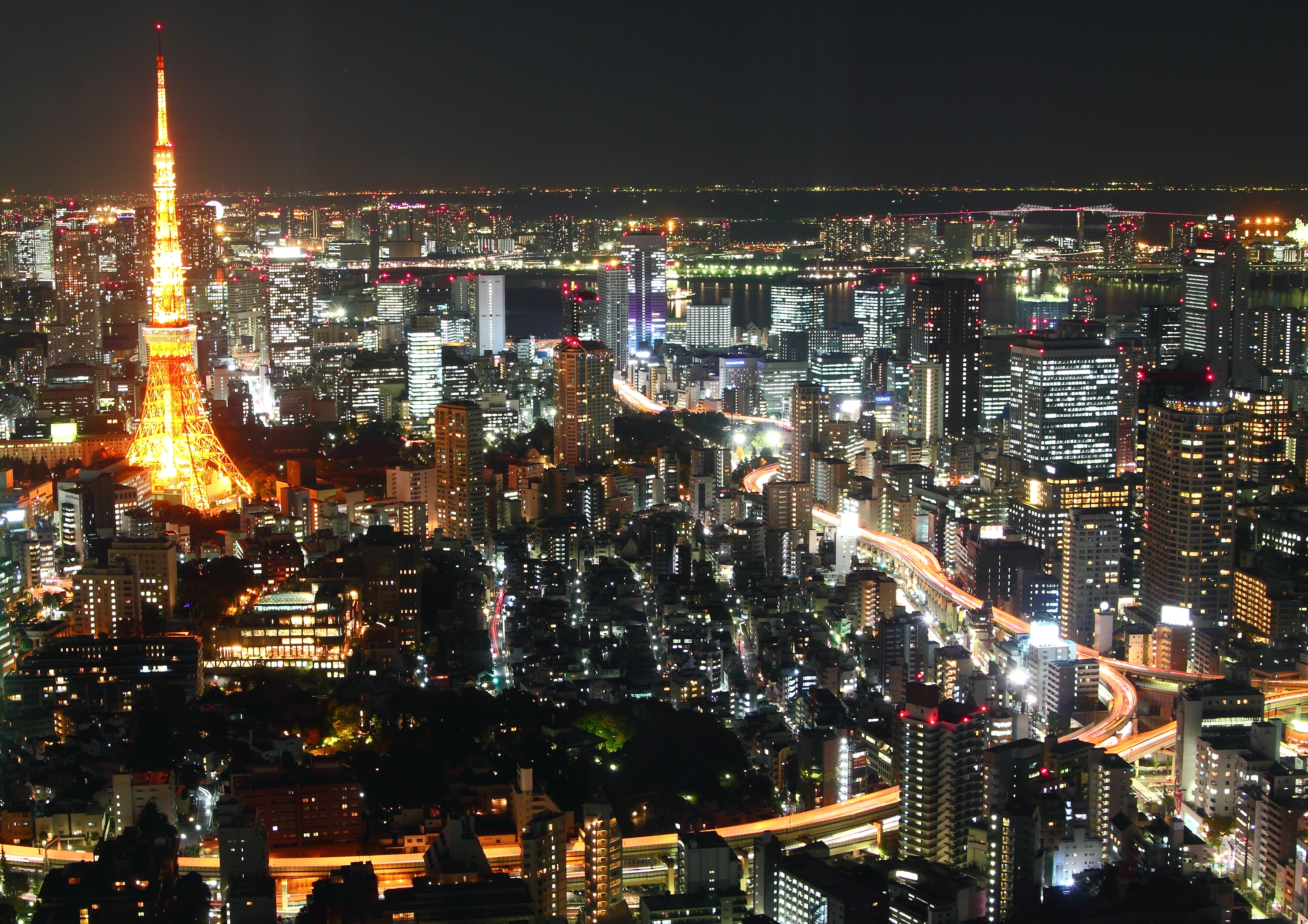
Tokyo Tower at night from Roppongi hills

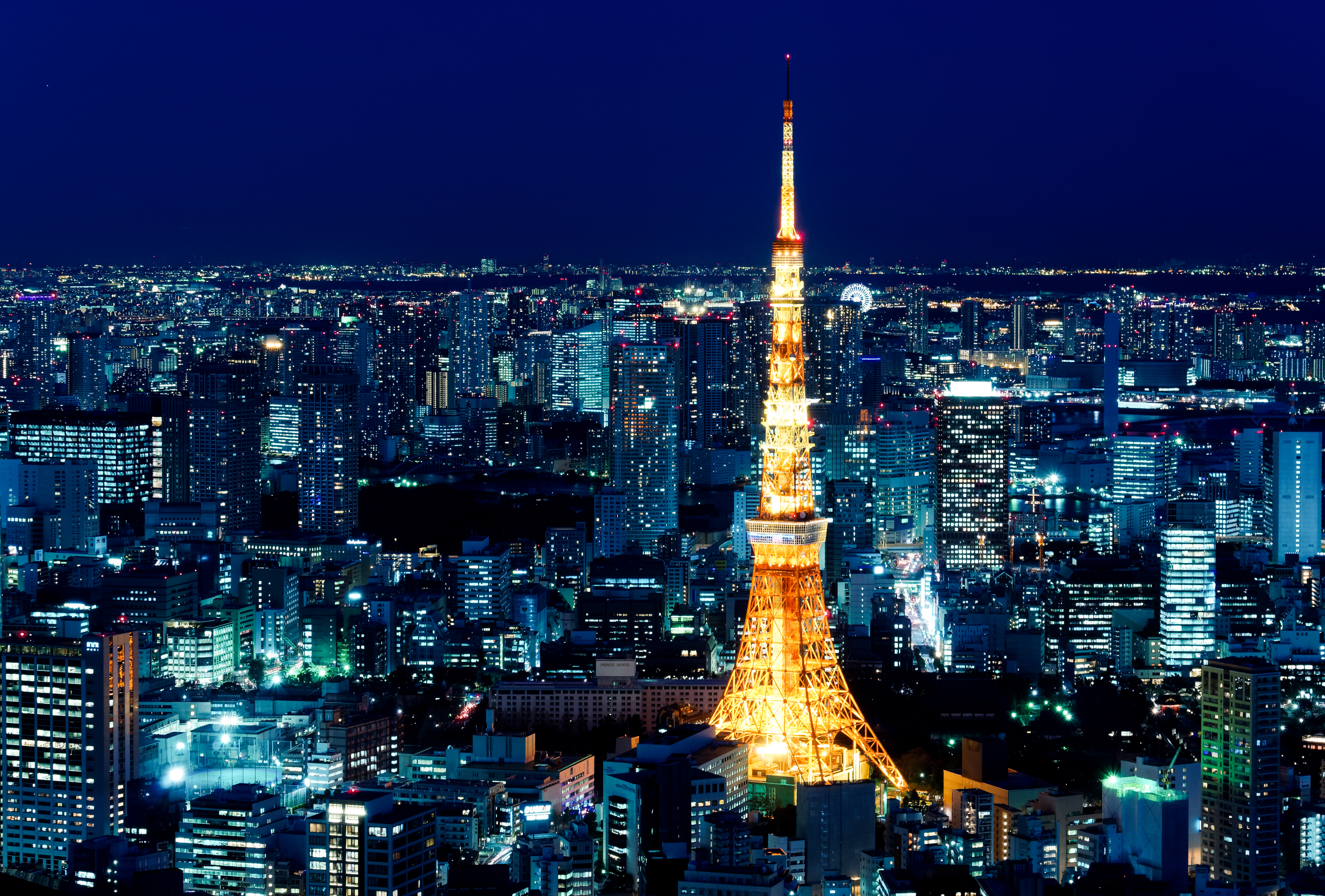
Tokyo Tower at night

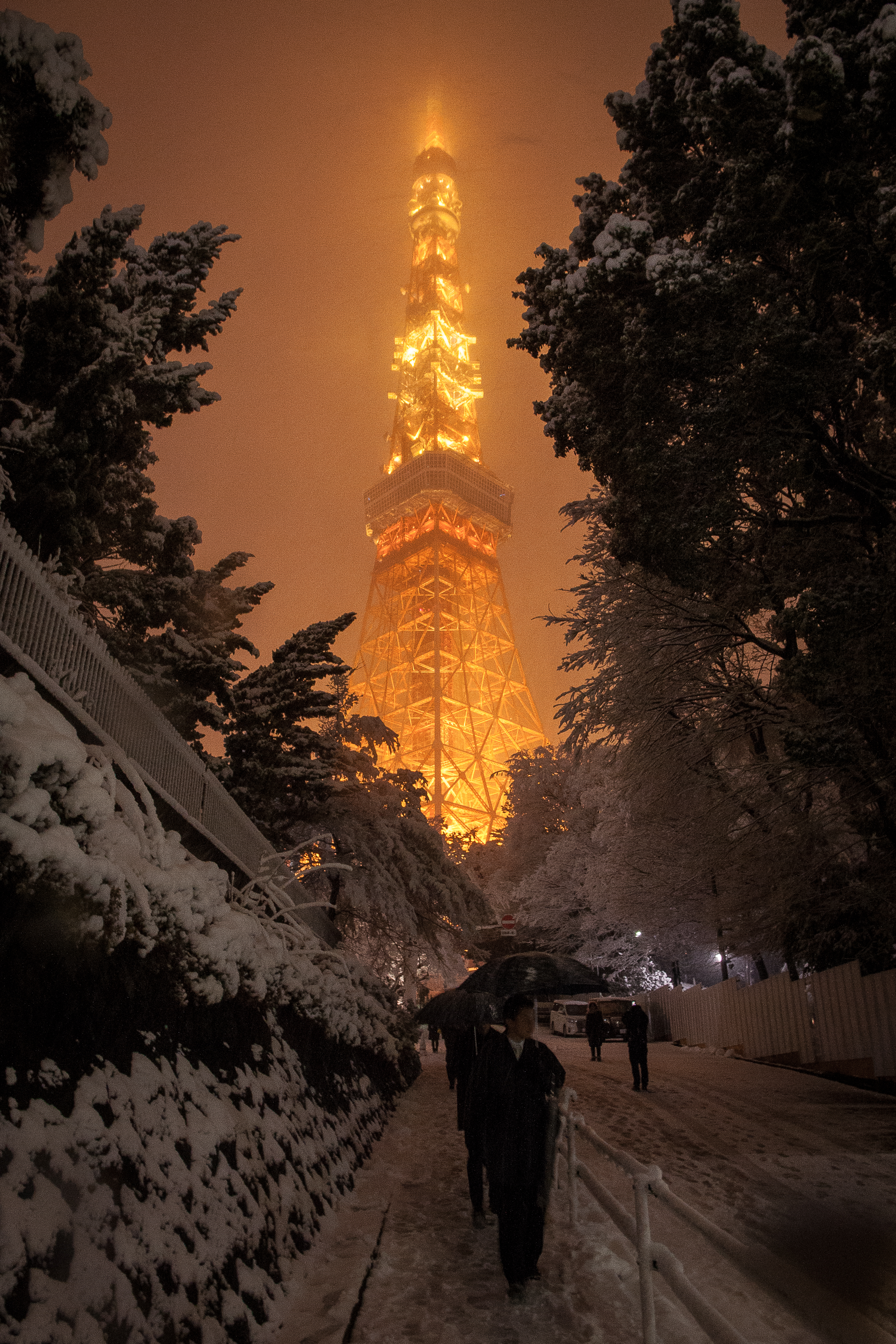
Tokyo Tower during a snowfall in 2018

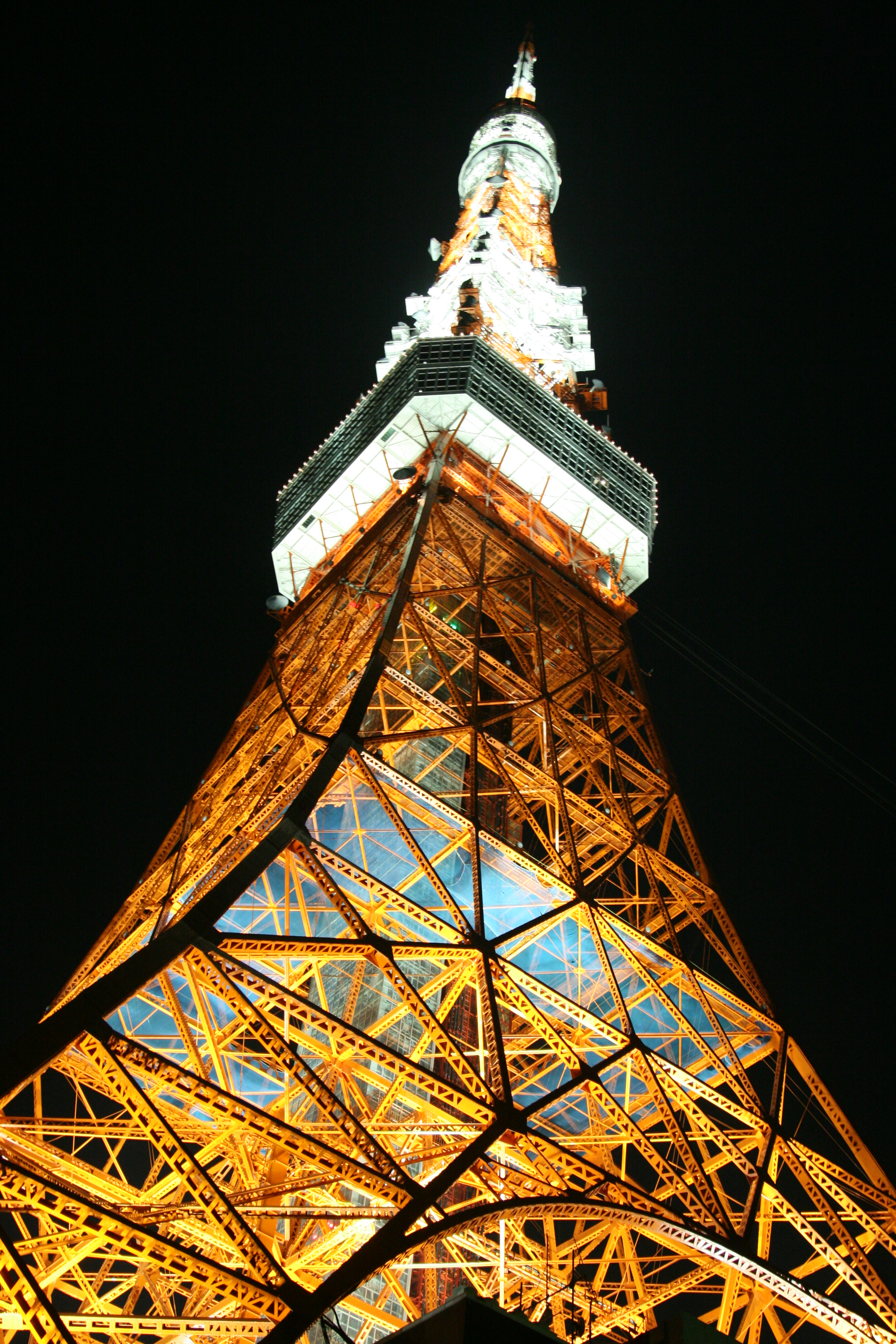
Summer night in 2008

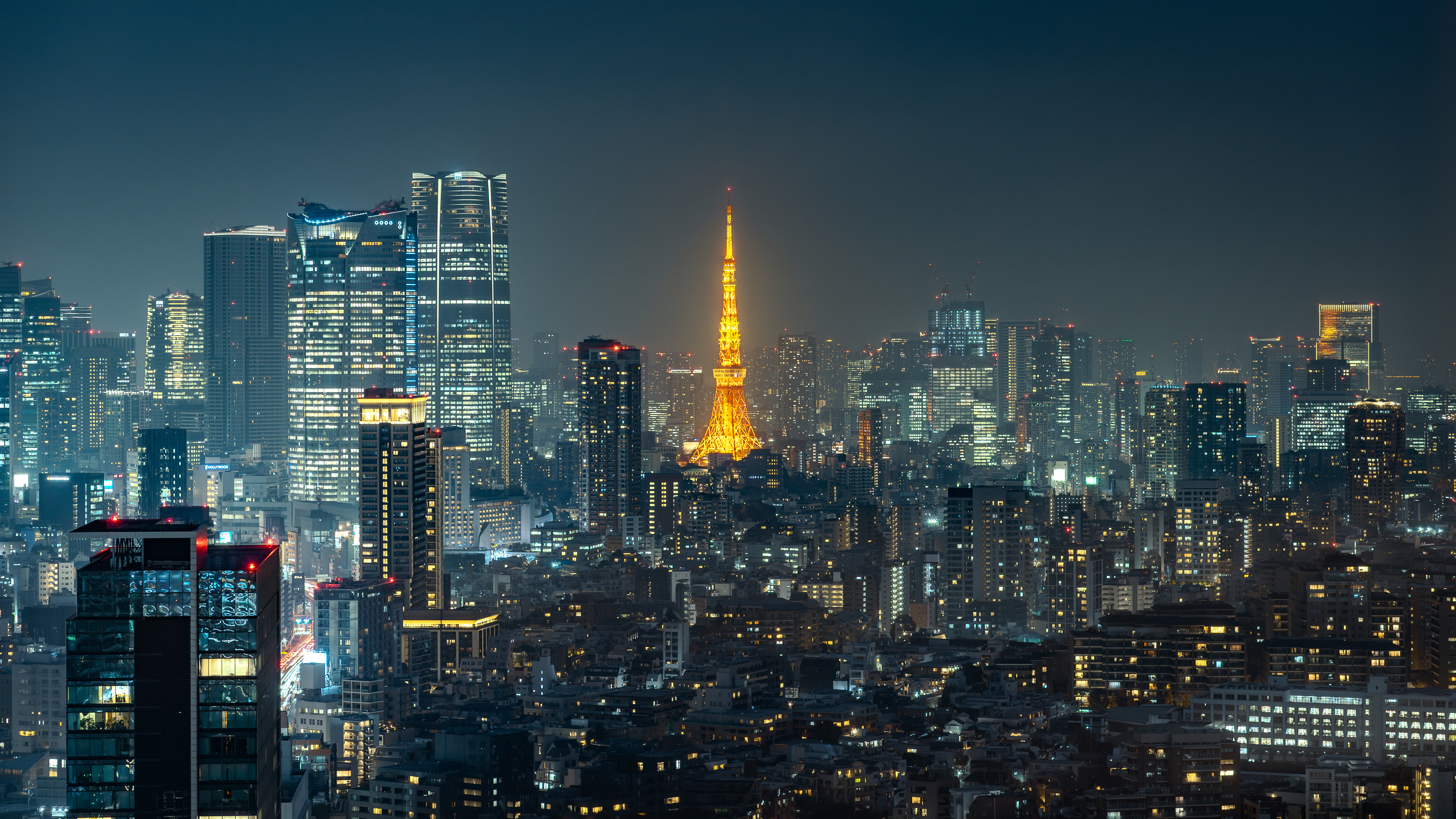
As seen from Shibuya Stream in Shibuya

== See also ==
- Nagoya TV Tower
- Sapporo TV Tower
- Media of Japan
- List of tallest freestanding structures
- List of tallest freestanding steel structures
- List of tallest towers
- List of transmission sites
- Lattice tower

Records
Preceded by Eiffel Tower	World's tallest free-standing tower 1958–1967	Succeeded by Ostankino Tower
Preceded by Eiffel Tower	World's tallest lattice tower 1958–1973	Succeeded by Kyiv TV Tower
