= Open University of Japan =

Higher education institution in Chiba Prefecture, Japan

- 放送大学
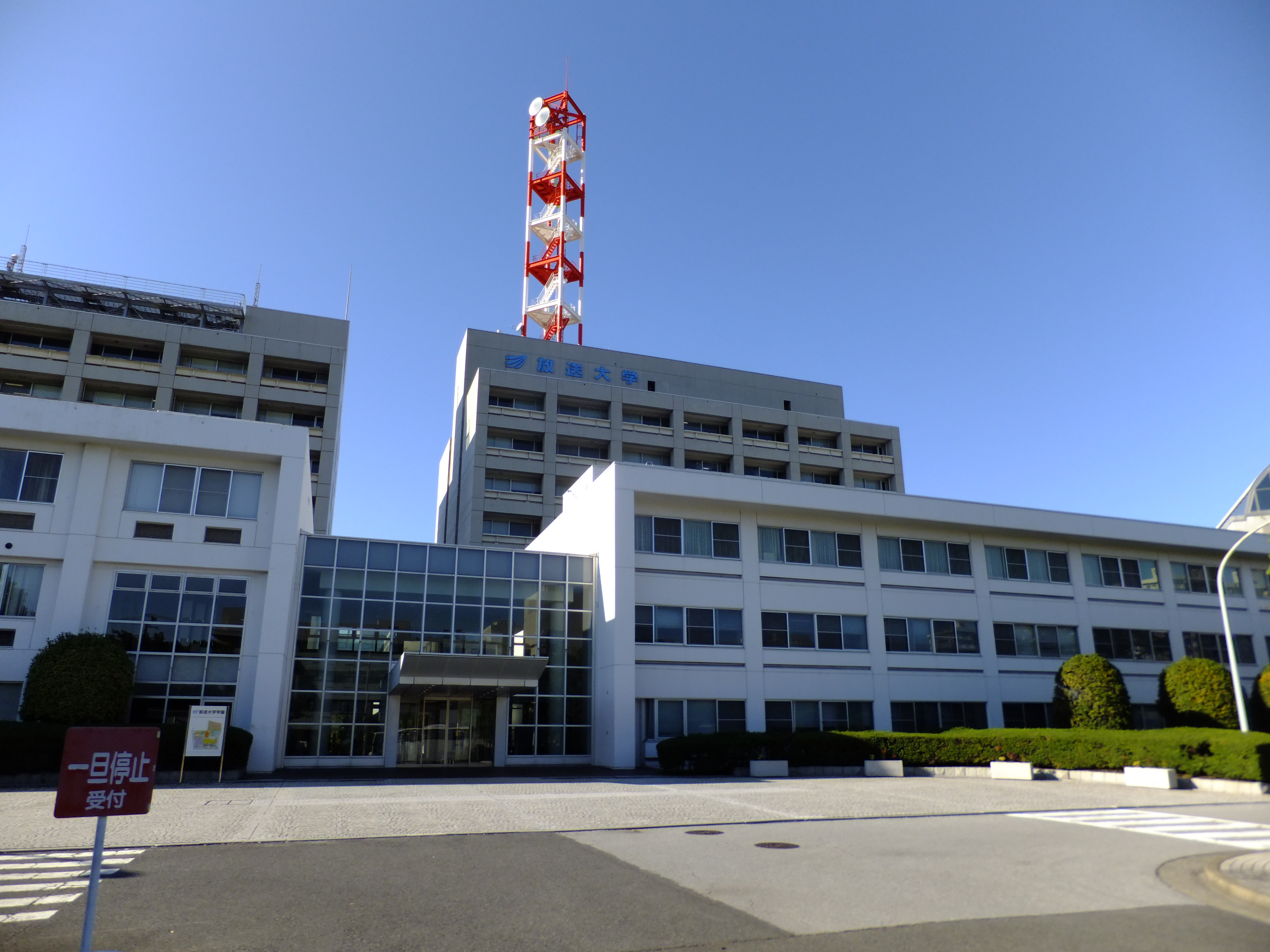
- Open University of Japan
- Motto: "Whenever, wherever, and by whomever"
- Type: Private (semi-public)
- Established: Founded 1981; Chartered 1983
- President: Masaya Iwanaga
- Undergraduates: 80,799 (2007)
- Postgraduates: 6,245 (2007)
- Location: Wakaba, Mihama-ku, Chiba City, Chiba, Japan
- Campus: Urban (learning centers)
- Member of: ICDE
- Website: www.ouj.ac.jp/eng/

The Open University of Japan (放送大学, Hōsō Daigaku; formerly the University of the Air (Note: The English name of the university was changed on 1 October 2007.)) is a distance learning university which has students from all over Japan; it accepted its first students in 1985.

== History ==
Although founded by the national government initiative with a single-issue law and heavily subsidized by the government, it was established by the University of the Air Foundation (放送大学学園, Hōsō Daigaku Gakuen) as a "special academic corporation" (特別な学校法人, tokubetsu na gakkō hōjin), the university classified as a private university in Japan.

It was founded on the basic system of the Open University in the United Kingdom. The administration is based in Chiba City although it has offices and learning centers in each of Japan's 47 prefectures. The university offers accredited undergraduate and graduate degrees.

With nearly 90,000 students enrolled (in 2007), 45,000 students graduated from the university. It is one of the largest academic institutions in the nation, and qualifies as one of the world's mega universities. Since it was founded, over 780,000 students have taken courses from the institution.

== Faculty of Liberal Arts ==
Bachelor's degree courses are available in six areas of study: Living and Welfare, Psychology and Education, Society and Industry, Humanities and Culture, Informatics, Nature and Environment.

== 2017 Syllabus ==
The syllabus is made up of foundation subjects, course subjects (introduction, speciality, and integrated), and graduation research units. Each study unit is supported by a specially written textbook, in conjunction with fifteen 45 minute recorded lectures. Many face-to-face lectures, condensed summer courses, and online units are also available. Apart from a very select few, subjects are offered in Japanese only.

Humanities and Culture

Introductory Units	Introduction to Philosophy ('14); People of Modern Philosophy ('12); Origins of Western Philosophy ('16); History and People ('14); Modern Day Japan ('15); European History I ('15); Introduction to Japanese Literature ('12); Kojiki and Manyōshū ('15); An Invitation to World Literature ('16); Japanese and Communication ('15); The World of Latin ('16); Introduction to Museums ('11); Descriptive Geography of the Globalization Era ('12)
Speciality Units	Philosophy of Modern France ('17); Empiricism to Language Philosophy ('16); Genealogy of German Philosophy ('14); Buddhism and Confucianism ('13); History and Theory of Western Arts ('16); Western Music History ('13); The Appeal of Performing Arts ('17); Ancient Japan ('17); Early Modern Japanese History ('13); Korean History ('15); China in History ('13); European History II ('15); American History ('14); The World of Waka Literature ('14); Reading Japanese Literary Masterpieces ('17); The World of Ueda Akinari ('16); Reading Literature of Europe - The Classics ('14); An Outline of Japanese ('15); Cultural Anthropology ('14); Fieldwork and National Documents ('17); Museum Education ('16); Museum Documentation ('12); Museum Document Preservation ('12); Museum Exhibition ('16); Museum Information and Media ('13); Museum Administration ('13); A Look at Lifelong Learning ('17); Statistics Laws of Psychology ('17); Comparative Cognitive Science ('17); History of Japanese Political Thought ('17)
Integrated Units	Investigating Sound ('16); Researching Colour and Form ('17); Safety, Peace of Mind and Regional Management ('14); Introduction to the Study of Life and Death ('14); Securities Market and Our Economy ('15); A Look at Developing Countries ('14); Japan in the Global Sphere ('15); A Look at Diverse Careers ('15); The Environment and Society ('15); Energy and Society ('15); Ecology of Literature ('13); Era of the International Volunteer ('14); Technology Management Systems ('14); Evolution of the Information Society ('15); Bio-science For Our Lives ('15)

Informatics

Introductory Units	Start Accounting ('13); Digital Information and Symbol Theory ('13); Everyday Digital Media ('14); Methods and Ethics of the Information Society ('14); Information Network ('14)
Speciality Units	Data Structure and Programming ('13); Computer Use and Management ('17); Software Structure ('14); Algorithms and Programming ('16); Basics of Java Programming ('16); Problem Solving Mathematics ('17); Data Analysis and Knowledge Discovery ('16); Symbolic Logic ('14); Numerical Processing and Analysis ('14); Basics of CGI and Image Composition ('16); Video Contents Production ('16); Digital Information Processing and Recognition ('12); Natural Language Processing ('15); ICT Use for Education ('17); User Research Method ('16); Information Society Universal Design ('14); Information Society and Education ('14); Introduction to Sensitivity Engineering ('16); Media and Intellectual Property ('16); Structure of Computers ('14); Familiar Network Services ('16); Information Security and Ethics ('14); Introduction to Communications ('14); Web Structure and Application ('15); Data Base ('17)
Integrated Units	Researching Colour and Form ('17); Safety, Peace of Mind and Regional Management ('14); Introduction to the Study of Life and Death ('14); Securities Market and Our Economy ('15); A Look at Developing Countries ('14); Japan in the Global Sphere ('15); A Look at Diverse Careers ('15); The Environment and Society ('15); Energy and Society ('15); Ecology of Literature ('13); Era of the International Volunteer ('14); Technology Management Systems ('14); Evolution of the Information Society ('15); Bio-science For Our Lives ('15)

== OUJ as a broadcasting station ==
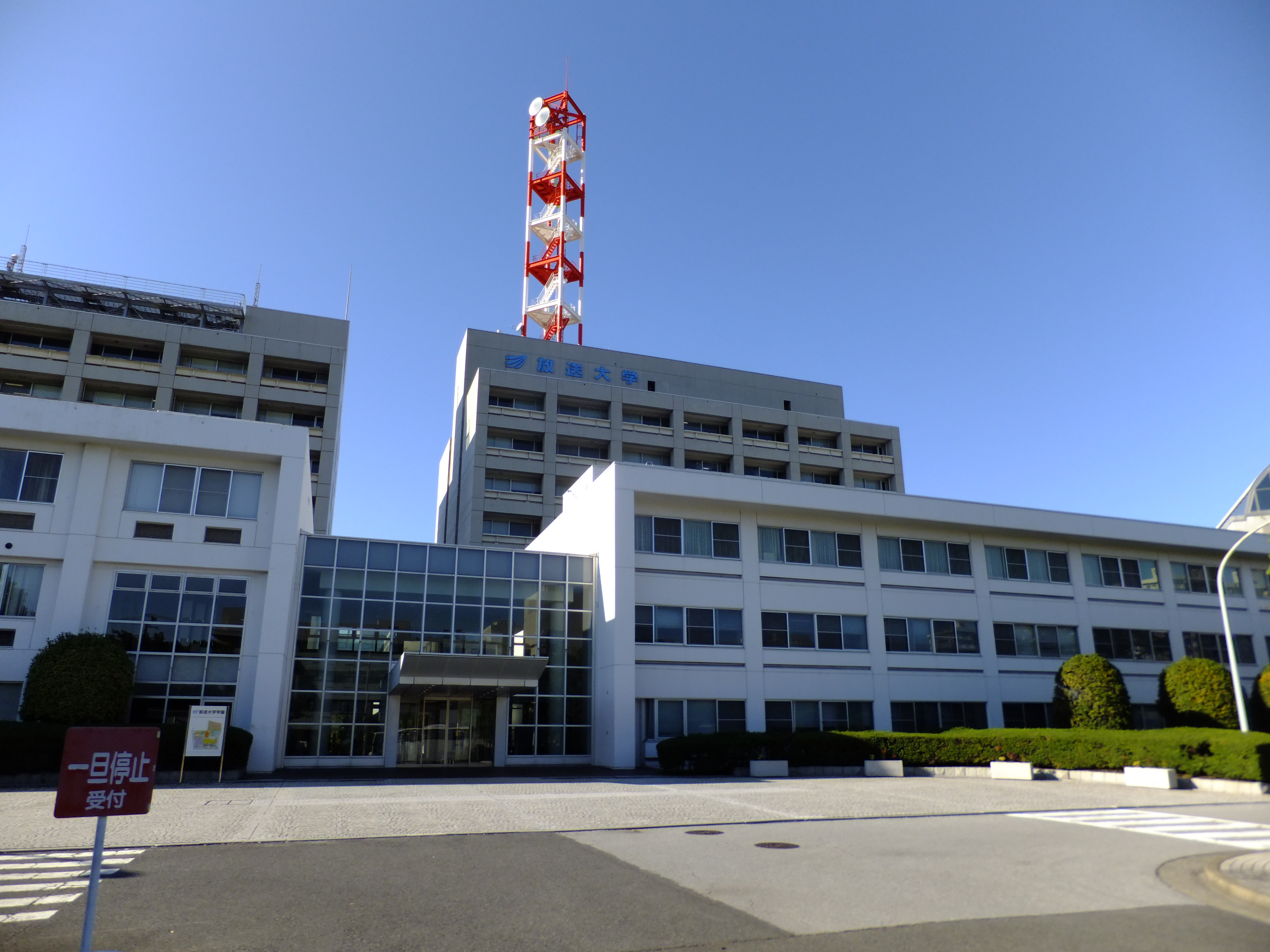
The Open University of Japan Headquarters (Microwave antenna to Tokyo Tower)

The OUJ Academia broadcasts lectures and administrative announcement programs. It owns television and radio broadcasting stations at the headquarters in Chiba City. All programs are recorded and edited at the headquarters and broadcasts on its Broadcasting Satellite (BS) channels to reach the whole nation. The broadcasts are exclusively in Japanese language as the medium of instruction. Article 50-4-1 of the Broadcasting Act prohibits the OUJ from broadcasting commercial messages. The cost of the broadcasting system is subsidised by the national budget. Until September 2018, it was transmitted from the Tokyo Tower via UHF television and FM radio, and relayed at Maebashi, Gunma to reach Kantō region.

It is not affiliated with any other broadcasting networks (although there was support from television stations in Tokyo at the beginning). During the period as a terrestrial television station it was the only purely independent/isolated terrestrial station in Japan.

== Broadcast media ==
Reception is free to the general public.

Nationwide on BS channel 231 (BS Campus ex) and 232 (BS Campus on) for television and channel 531 for radio. No contract charge or subscription fees are charged at OUJ-only recipients. Some cable television and cable radio also re-transmit the broadcasts.

== See also ==
- School of the Air
- Satellite television
