= Wikitude =

Austrian mobile augmented reality technology provider

- Developer: Wikitude GmbH
- Release: October 20, 2008; 18 years ago
- Final release: 9.14.0 / May 23, 2023; 3 years ago
- Operating system: Android, iOS, UWP
- Available in: English
- Type: Augmented reality
- License: Free Trial and Commercial License
- Website: www.wikitude.com

Wikitude was a mobile augmented reality (AR) technology provider based in Salzburg, Austria. Founded in 2008, Wikitude initially focused on providing location-based augmented reality experiences through the Wikitude World Browser App. In 2012, the company restructured its proposition by launching the Wikitude SDK, a development framework that uses image recognition and tracking, and geolocation technology.

In September 2021 Wikitude announced that it has been acquired by Qualcomm.

The Wikitude SDK (software development kit) serves as a foundational product for the company. First launched in October 2008, the SDK includes image recognition and tracking, 3D model rendering, video overlay, location based AR. In 2017 Wikitude launched its SLAM technology (Simultaneous Localization And Mapping) which enables object recognition and tracking, as well as markerless instant tracking.

The versatile SDK is compatible with Android, iOS, and Windows operating systems, and it has also been optimized for various smart eyewear devices.

The Wikitude app pioneered the use of a location-based approach in augmented reality.

As of September 21, 2023, no new subscription purchases can be made, and existing subscriptions cannot be renewed. Support for the Wikitude SDK has ceased on September 21, 2024, at which time all associated Wikitude services have been shut down.

== Functionality ==
=== Location based augmented reality ===
Wikitude initially entered the market with its geo location AR app. The Wikitude app pioneered the use of a location-based approach in augmented reality.

For location-based augmented reality, the position of objects on the screen of the mobile device is calculated using the user's position (by GPS or Wi-Fi), the direction in which the user is facing (by using the compass) and accelerometer. Augmentations can be placed at specific points of interest and afterwards viewed through the devices' screen or lenses.

=== Image Recognition ===
Since August 2012, Wikitude also features image recognition technologies that allow for tracker images to trigger augmented reality technology within the app.

The software identifies relevant feature points of the target image (also known as marker). This allows to overlay and stick augmentations in specific position on top or around the image.

=== SLAM: Instant Tracking, Object and Scene Recognition ===
In 2017 Wikitude launched its SLAM technology. Instant Tracking, the first feature using SLAM, allows developers to easily map environments and display augmented reality content without the need for target images (markers). Object Recognition is the latest addition based on SLAM, with the launch of SDK 7. The idea behind Object Recognition and Tracking is very similar to Image Tracking, but instead of recognizing images and planar surfaces, the Object Tracker can work with three-dimensional structures and objects (tools, toys, machinery, etc.).

== Reception ==
Opinions differ as to whether the location-based approach of augmented reality implemented by Wikitude can be considered as augmented reality. There is also concern for the accuracy of the GPS, compass and motion sensors used to calculate the position of the virtual objects. Inaccuracies could accumulate to the point that they prevent delivering a feasible result. In practice, this technique proves to be much simpler to implement than ones using the marker-based approach. In a current listing of the Top 5 AR Apps from The Telegraph, three mobile applications use the location-based approach (Google Goggles used both approaches).

== Awards ==
- 2017:
  - Best Developer Tool 2017, Augmented World Expo
- 2015:
  - Honorable Mentions for Best Tool 2015, Augmented World Expo
- 2012:
  - Best Augmented Reality Browser, Augmented Planet
  - Best Augmented Reality Developer Tool, Augmented Planet
  - Android Apps Magazine – Best Augmented Reality app 2013
- 2011:
  - Best Augmented Reality Browser, Augmented Planet
  - Best Augmented Reality Developer Tool, Augmented Planet
  - Best BBM Connected Application, BlackBerry® EMEA Innovation Award
  - Most Addictive Social App using BBM Social Platform, 2011 BlackBerry Developer Challenge
- 2010:
  - Best Augmented Reality Browser, Augmented Planet;
  - World Summit Award
  - Galileo Master 2010 at European Satellite Navigation Competition
  - Global Champion at Navteq Challenge 2010
  - Hagenberg Award
  - Grand Prize Winner Navteq Challenge 2010 (EMEA Region)
- 2009:
  - Best Augmented Reality Browser, Augmented Planet
  - GSMA Mobile Innovation 2009 Global Competition EMEA "Top Innovator"
  - Salzburger Wirtschaftspreis
- 2008:
  - Android Developer Challenge Top-50 Award
