= European Satellite Navigation Competition =

The European Satellite Navigation Competition (ESNC) is an annual international innovation competition that recognises downstream applications of satellite navigation. Anyone is free to enter. The ESNC was inaugurated in three regions in 2004 under the patronage of the Bavarian Ministry of Economic Affairs and is organised by Anwendungszentrum GmbH Oberpfaffenhofen (AZO). Since 2011, the competition is also supported by the European Commission. Until 2006, the ESNC was called “Galileo Masters" in reference to the European satellite navigation system Galileo.

== Mission ==
The European Satellite Navigation Competition (ESNC) seeks to gather innovative ideas and solutions for commercial applications of satellite navigation technology and promote individual ideas by offering prizes. It provides the opportunity to present and promote ideas – and eventually put them into practice.

== Partners ==
The ESNC is supported by more than 20 regional and national partners, including more than 130 organisations that host regional challenges. Many of the ideas submitted in previous years have already been implemented and successfully brought to market.

== Prizes ==
The ESNC's total prize pool is valued at approximately EUR 1 million, which includes cash, business incubation, business coaching, patent consulting, technical support, access to testing facilities, prototype development, publicity, marketing support, market and feasibility studies, access to experts and public funding, licenses and much more. The following special prizes will be awarded in 2016: • European Space Agency (ESA): ESA space solutions Prize • German Aerospace Center (DLR): Entry into Service – Head Start with Galileo Services! • Federal Ministry of Transport and Digital Infrastructure (BMVI) – PRS applications – reliable services for a secure digital society • BELS – Building European Link toward South East Asia in the field of EGNSS: Innovative GNSS Solutions for South East Asia • The ESNC University Challenge: From the Lecture Hall to the Board Room • GNSS Living Lab Prize

== Awards Ceremony ==
All of the winners will be recognised at the Awards Ceremony to be held at the end of October.

== Previous Winning Ideas ==
2013: KINEXON The overall winner of 2013 submitted an augmented-reality application that conducts precise localisation and monitoring for sports and healthcare. The KINEXON CELL is a revolutionary wearable sensor that uses the latest space technology to track the positions of individuals and objects with centimetre accuracy. The corresponding KINEXON APP is a secure cloud-computing platform with a smart analytics application. It transforms big sensor data into valuable information in real time.

2012: ULF-MC The overall winner of 2012 submitted a solution that allows accurate indoor navigation with existing smartphones. ULF-MC will enable you to navigate indoors and receive location-based information relevant to you and your friends. The system is based on relative location IDs that are transferred to absolute positions involving the last GNSS fix. This technology has been designed for use on existing smartphones through utilisation of their threeaxis hall sensors (electronic compasses).

2011: True3D™ Head Up Display The overall winner of 2011 submitted an augmented-reality application that involves a disruptive technology in LBS and mapping. The Head Up Display provides a translucent location guidance that shows users a Virtual Cable and Virtual Signs (such as icons or road signs) in their forward view. This information seems to appear beyond the user's windshield (from a distance of two metres to infinity) and is generated by linking GNSS, map, and POI data.

2010: Wikitude Drive The 2010 winner developed a navigation system that uses augmented reality in combination with global maps to superimpose directions onto a live smartphone video stream. This enables drivers to follow suggested routes based on real-world imagery instead of abstract maps.

2009: Osmógrafo The Galileo Master 2009 created a device to assist search-and-rescue coordinators in determining whether an area has been fully searched by canine teams. It consists of a GNSS tracking device for dogs and a wind sensor that sends information to a central monitoring unit.

2008: Real-Time Rescue - A Personal GNSS tracker In 2008, the winners developed a small electronic device to be worn by ship crew members. In case they fall overboard, a unit on the ship logs the position and initiates an audio and visual alarm.

2007: Algorithm, Procedure and Device for the Protection of Financial Transactions The winning project in 2007 proposed a new encryption procedure which is supposed to make financial transactions safer. This procedure combines encryption algorithms already in use with time signals delivered by Galileo.

2006: Geosynch The Galileo Master 2006 created a product that helps predict natural disasters such as volcanic eruptions and earthquakes. It provides increased accuracy thanks to its use of time signals from Galileo satellites.

2005: VU Log The winner in 2005 developed a web-based service that tells registered users where to find the nearest available electric car. This car-sharing initiative also includes a common pool of compact electric cars.

2004: Marine Navigation for Fishermen using GPS and IPWV (Integrated Precipitable Water Vapour) Technique The first Galileo Master had an idea for low-priced GPS surveillance equipment that would enable fishermen in developing countries to receive weather forecasts and locate fish populations.

== The Organiser ==
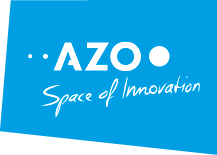

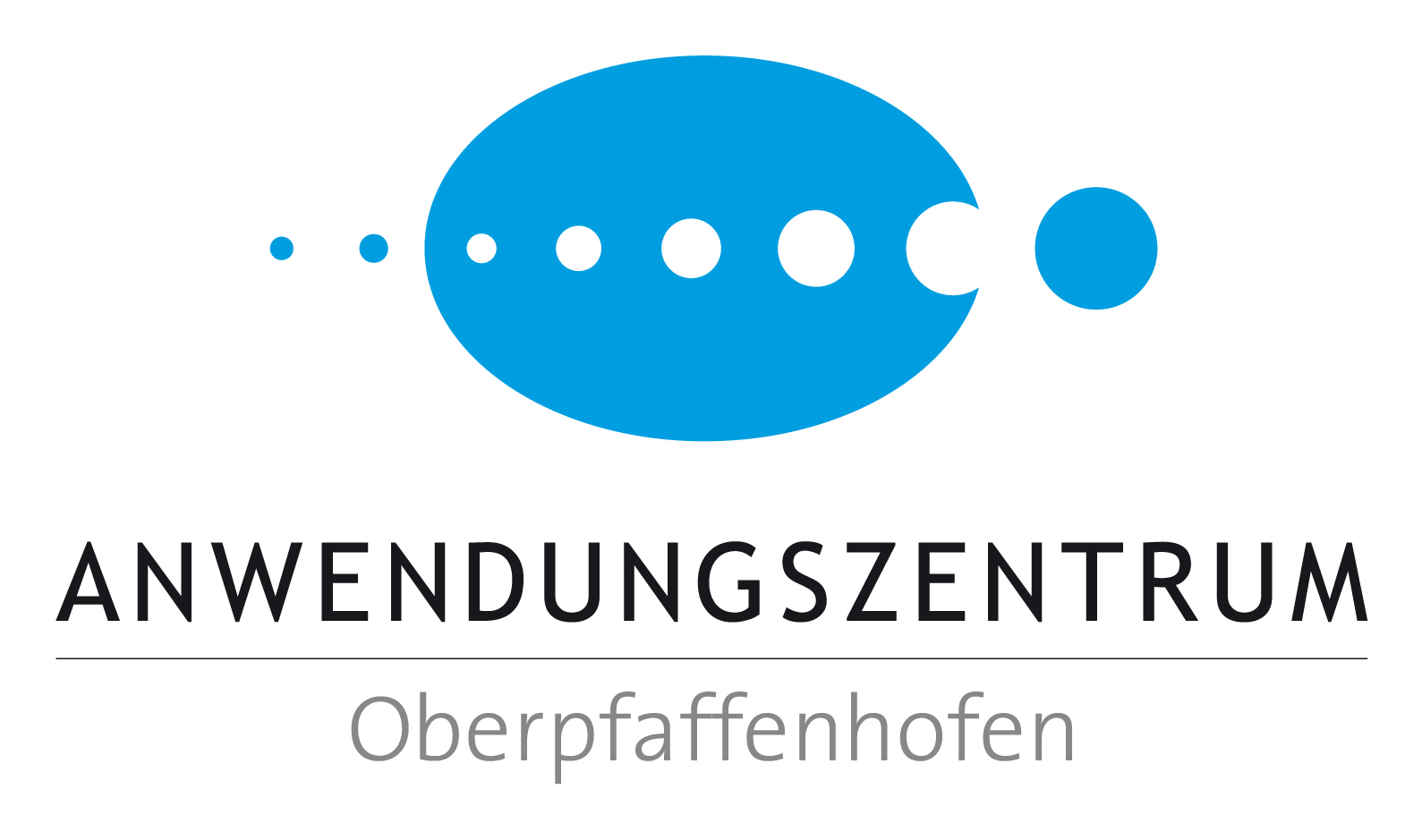
Organiser of the ESNC

The European Satellite Navigation Competition is organised by Anwendungszentrum GmbH Oberpfaffenhofen (AZO). This company was founded in 2004 by the German Aerospace Center (DLR) and the Bavarian Ministry of Economic Affairs in Oberpfaffenhofen (near Munich, Germany), a prominent hub of the aerospace industry.
