= LyteShot =

Augmented reality gaming platform

- LyteShot logo
- Release: 2015
- Operating system: Android, iOS
- Website: www.lyteshot.com

LyteShot was an interactive augmented reality gaming platform.

== Overview ==
LyteShot used augmented reality with mobile phones and augmented reality smartglasses for interactive gameplay. The website is down and the last update was in 2016, although Twitter and Facebook accounts still exist. The platform integrated sensor-based hardware which wirelessly connects to users’ mobile devices and with the Internet of Things (IoT) to share in-game data via the cloud. The platform's sensor-based peripherals connect with mobile phones to bring multi-player digital alternate reality game or first-person shooter gameplay into the real world which adds digital components to live-action games.

LyteShot platform consists of three core components to the system: a handheld device, called a "Lyter"; a receiver, called a "LytePuck", worn by each player; and LyteShot-enabled game applications on users' Bluetooth Low Energy-enabled smartphones operating on either iOS or Android. The Lyter, LytePuck, and mobile smartphone game apps connect to the cloud via Bluetooth enabling transmission of game data for types of live action role-playing games, thus eliminating the need for referees or gamekeepers. Various peripherals, representing weapons and/or tools such as a gun or a sword, have also been developed to attach to the "Lyter" while gaming, and users can also create their own attachments through design and 3D printing.

LyteShot's first game release is Assassin: The Game, a first-person shooter based on the live action game of the same name. Developers can utilize the platforms software developer kit (SDK) allowing independent users to develop their own games for use with LyteShot's hardware and mobile technology.

LyteShot was named as a Consumer Electronics Show (CES) Innovation Design Award honoree in the Gaming Hardware and Accessories category. In addition, LLteShot received Game Connections's international award for Most Original/ Creative Project as well as the Auggie Award from Augmented World Expo (AWE) for Best Game. LyteShot debuted the platform at CES 2015 with Epson as a featured developer for the Epson Moverio BT-200 Smartglasses.

The LyteShot company was founded in December 2012 by CEO Mark Ladd, an architect and specialist in 3D data visualization; and David Brooks, a mechanical engineer who left the company in 2013. Tom Ketola, a veteran of game development at companies such as Activision and Disney Interactive Studios served as CTO from May 2014 until April 2015.; The company is headquartered in Chicago, Illinois.
