= SpecTrek =

Geolocation-based and augmented reality game

- Operating system: Android
- Type: Geolocation-based, augmented reality
- Website: play.google.com/store/apps/details?id=com.spectrekking.full

SpecTrek is a geolocation-based and augmented reality ghost hunting game. The game won second prize in the "Android Developer Challenge II" lifestyle category.

SpecTrek was designed to have the user work-out whilst playing the game, the tag line for the game is "protect the world, stay in shape". There are three default games to play, short which lasts 15 minutes, medium which lasts for 30 minutes, and long which lasts for 60 minutes. SpecTrek projects ghosts at various locations on a Google map in either a predetermined search radius or a user defined search radius. To play the user must walk to these ghosts, if within range the user can scan and find out what kind of ghost is nearby as well as how far said ghost is from their current position. If the user is unable to reach a ghost, a horn may be blown which makes all nearby ghosts flee and possibly stop within reach of another accessible location.

The user catches ghosts by tilting their phone to the "camera-position". Through the camera the user can scan the ghosts, see the ghosts in augmented reality and of course catch the ghosts.
