= Special Class for the Gifted Young =

Chinese university entry program

The Special Class for the Gifted Young (SCGY, Chinese: 少年班) is a program aimed to select gifted young students to enter the universities in China. Currently, only the University of Science and Technology of China and Xi'an Jiaotong University still have this program.

First established in 1978 at the University of Science and Technology of China, it was a major innovation in China's higher education. Eminent scientists including Tsung-Dao Lee, C. N. Yang, and Samuel C. C. Ting proposed creating the program, and the then Vice-premier of the State Council Fang Yi backed it. The objective of the class is to explore the most efficient ways to nurture promising youth. Peking University, Tsinghua University, Nanjing University, Wuhan University, Jilin University, Shanghai Jiaotong University and Huazhong University of Science and Technology also launched similar programs. But they were all shut down for all kinds of reasons.

== University of Science and Technology of China ==
As of October 2006, the Special Class for the Gifted Young of the University of Science and Technology of China has enrolled a total of 1134 exceptionally gifted youth, 942 of whom have already graduated.

With the success of the class, a new class was established and adjoined to the original class in 1985, namely "The Experimental Class of Teaching Reform", more popularly known as the Double Zero Class, which is conducted under the same guiding spirit as the Special Class for the Gifted Young. This class has now become an integral part of the program. In 2008, the Special Class for the Gifted Young combined with the Experimental Class of Teaching Reform and the Experimental Class of Innovation became the School of the Gifted Young. The three classes now select students in different ways, while the admitted students receive the same training from the school.

The Special Class for the Gifted Young upholds the guiding principle of "selecting talents despite their age and cater to their individual potentials." The curriculum aims to strengthen the foundation courses and an all-round education in the first two years, and in the later years allow students to enjoy wide latitude in developing their potentials and interest. Students are encouraged to attend seminar courses, sign up for the various "student research projects," and participate in their professors' research projects. This kind of real research environment not only provides valuable opportunities for them to apply what they have learned in the classroom and give their initiative and creativity full play, but also enhances the spirit of teamwork and cultivates personal integrity.

The past two decades has proven the success of the program. Its students have won numerous prizes in such international and national contests. 80 percent of its graduates have been enrolled in postgraduate programs at home or abroad, one third of whom have already obtained doctoral degrees. Its graduates have now spread all over the world. Among them are the 31-year-old and 34-year-old full professors at Harvard University, the 40-year-old US National Academy of Sciences member, the 31-year-old IEEE fellow and the president of Baidu, the discoverer of the smallest possible carbon nanotube, winners of the U.S. Presidential Early Career Award for Scientists and Engineers, TR35 innovators selected by MIT Technology Review and so on.

=== Special Class for the Gifted Young ===
Established in 1978, the Special Class for the Gifted Young (SCGY) is the traditional and original program of its kind. Its establishment was based on the idea suggested by scientists such as Tsung-Dao Lee, C. N. Yang, and Samuel C. C. Ting . SCGY has strict age limit; for instance, to enroll in 2016, the student must have a birth date after January 1, 2000. Prospective students must first pass

the National College Entrance Examination in China, and then the final test arranged by USTC, which mainly focuses on the student's ability in mathematics and physics. Approximately 40 to 50 students are admitted to the class every year.

==== Notable alumni ====
- Xiaowei Zhuang - Professor of Chemistry and Chemical Biology & Physics, Howard Hughes Medical Institute Investigator, Harvard University, member of National Academy of Sciences
- Zhang Yaqin (张亚勤) - Corporate Vice President, Chairman of Microsoft China and Microsoft Research China Microsoft
- Liqun Luo - Professor of Biological Sciences, Howard Hughes Medical Institute Investigator, Stanford University, member of National Academy of Sciences, fellow of American Association for the Advancement of Science
- Tianxi Cai - Professor of Biostatistics, Harvard University
- Ju Li - Battelle Energy Alliance Professor of Nuclear Science and Engineering and Professor of Materials Science and Engineering, MIT
- Zhong Shao (邵中) - Professor of Computer Science, Yale University
- Shanhui Fan (范汕洄) - Professor of Electrical Engineering, Stanford University
- Zheng-Tian Lu (卢征天) - Professor of Physics, University of Chicago
- Jun-Lin Guan(管俊林) - Professor of Internal Medicine, Molecular Medicine & Genetics, University of Michigan, fellow of American Association for the Advancement of Science
- Xi Yin - Professor of physics, Harvard University

=== Experimental Class of Innovation ===
The Experimental Class of Innovation was established in 2008, with relatively weak age limit. For instance, to enroll in 2016, the student must have a birth date after January 1, 1999.

=== Experimental Class of Teaching Reform ===
More popularly known as the Double Zero Class (Chinese: 零零班), the Experimental Class of Teaching Reform selects students with regular process, and therefore has no age limit. It is supposed to consist of the best students admitted by the university. Upon admission to the university, students have another chance to join this class, provided that they perform extremely well in the university's examination for all newly admitted students.

== Xi'an Jiaotong University ==
In 1985, Xi'an Jiaotong University established a special class for gifted youth called Honors Youth Program of Xi'an Jiaotong University (Chinese: 西安交大少年班, also translated as Special Class for the Gifted Young of Xi'an Jiaotong University, a name usually confused with the equivalent in the USTC). The class aims to select talents and explore ways to nurture promising youth without the widely criticized Gaokao and other standardized tests. Every January, XJTU holds tests and interviews for thousands of 9th grade applicants from all over mainland China and admits about 140 students. Youth Class students first study high school courses in High School Affiliated to Xi'an Jiaotong University, Suzhou High School-SIP, or Tianjin Nankai High School. After passing final exams of high school courses, students can directly become undergraduates of XJTU without taking Gaokao. After passing final exams of undergraduate courses, students can directly enter the master's degree programs at XJTU without taking the Master's Program Admissions Exam. Alumni of Youth Class include Zhou Hongyi, co-founder of Chinese antivirus software company Qihoo, Xi Chen, a Presidential Scholar and associate professor at Columbia University, and Haitao Zheng, a 2005 TR35 innovator selected by MIT Technology Review.

== See also ==
- Education in the People's Republic of China
- University of Science and Technology of China

== Sources ==
- Dai, David Yun; Steenbergen-Hu, Saiying (2015-01-02). "Special Class for the Gifted Young: A 34-Year Experimentation With Early College Entrance Programs in China". Roeper Review. 37 (1): 9–18. doi:10.1080/02783193.2014.975882. ISSN 0278-3193.
- Zha, Qiang; Li, Jun; Xiaofang, Cheng (2012). "The University of Science and Technology of China – Can the Caltech Model take Root in Chinese Soil?". Portraits of 21st Century Chinese Universities. Dordrecht: Springer Netherlands. pp. 271–306. doi:10.1007/978-94-007-2789-2_9. ISBN 978-94-007-2788-5.
- Zhao, Weijie (2022-03-31). "Honor classes in China's higher education: perspectives from four universities" (PDF). National Science Review. 9 (3) nwac002. doi:10.1093/nsr/nwac002. ISSN 2095-5138. PMC 8970326. PMID 35371515.
