= National Business Daily =

Chinese newspapaer

- News Determines Influence
- Type: Daily newspaper
- Founded: December 9, 2004
- Language: Chinese, English
- Headquarters: Shanghai; Chengdu; Overseas liaison: New York City
- OCLC number: 144518615
- Website: nbd.com.cn nbdpress.com

National Business Daily
- Traditional Chinese: 每日經濟新聞
- Simplified Chinese: 每日经济新闻
- Literal meaning: Everyday Economic News
Transcriptions
Standard Mandarin
- Hanyu Pinyin: Měirì jīngjì xīnwén

The National Business Daily (Note: Chinese: 每日经济新闻; pinyin: Měirì jīngjì xīnwén; also known as Everyday Economic News or Daily Economic News) is a nationwide Chinese financial and economic daily newspaper published in China. The publication was officially inaugurated on December 9, 2004, and is considered a state-funded publication.

Headquartered in Shanghai and Chengdu, National Business Daily was co-founded by Chengdu Daily Newspaper Group (成都日报报业集团) and Jiefang Daily Newspaper Group (解放日报报业集团) in 2004.

== History ==
=== Investigation of carcinogenic chemical in Bawang Shampoo ===
In 2010, National Business Daily reported that Bawang Shampoo (霸王洗发水) contained a cancer-causing chemical called dioxane and used expired lot numbers. In response, Bawang Group's employees stormed the newspaper's Shanghai office and verbally abused and pushed related reporter. In response to this incident, CEO of Bawang Group, Wan Yuhua (万玉华), made a special trip to the National Business Daily to apologize for the incident. She said that the company's staff responsible for the incident would be dealt with seriously.

=== Investigation of Changchun Changsheng vaccine scandal ===
In 2018, National Business Daily was the first in China to reveal the problematic vaccines made by Changsheng Bio-Technology and to dig into the inside information to expose the various scandals of its performance fraud and sales by bribery.

=== Dispute with Qihoo 360 ===
On February 26, 2013, National Business Daily published The Mystery of 360's Black Box – Qihoo 360's "Cancerous" Genes Revealed (360黑匣子之谜——奇虎360“癌”性基因大揭秘) and 360's "Secrets" of Winning: The Mysterious V3 Upgrade Mechanism (360制胜“秘籍”：神秘的V3升级机制), revealing that when Qihoo 360 wants to wage a war against its competitors, it will start the "V3 Mechanism" – through "360 Safeguard" and "360 Secure Browser", it will uninstall competitors' products on users' computers and install the products it wants to promote privately, so as to capture the market in the most convenient way. In addition to this, National Business Daily made a special report on its website. The following day, Qihoo 360 filed a lawsuit with the Shanghai City First Intermediate People's Court (上海市第一中级人民法院).

On July 4, 2013, National Business Daily published another article claiming that Qihoo 360 had unknowingly uploaded a large amount of sensitive information such as users' financial usernames and passwords, and that the situation had been brought to the attention of a securities firm.

On December 30, 2013, Qihoo 360 filed a lawsuit in the Shanghai City Xuhui District People's Court (上海市徐汇区人民法院) against the National Business Daily for allegedly making false reports and infringing on business reputation. 360 claimed that the National Business Daily published anonymously false reports that disparaged and insulted 360 and its products, and that the false reports were grossly untrue, misleading and intimidating the readers by quoting rumors made up by 360's competitors. As a result, the false news published by National Business Daily had seriously damaged the goodwill of 360 and its products, and 360 requested the court to find that National Business Daily had seriously infringed on the company's right to goodwill, and to compensate for the economic loss of ¥50 million.

Ultimately, the court ruled against the National Business Daily, ordering it to pay ¥1.5 million in compensation to Qihoo 360 to cover its economic losses, and requiring the outlet to publicly apologize to Qihoo for ten consecutive days.
