= Wang Shuguo =

Chinese university administrator and politician (born 1958)

- 王树国
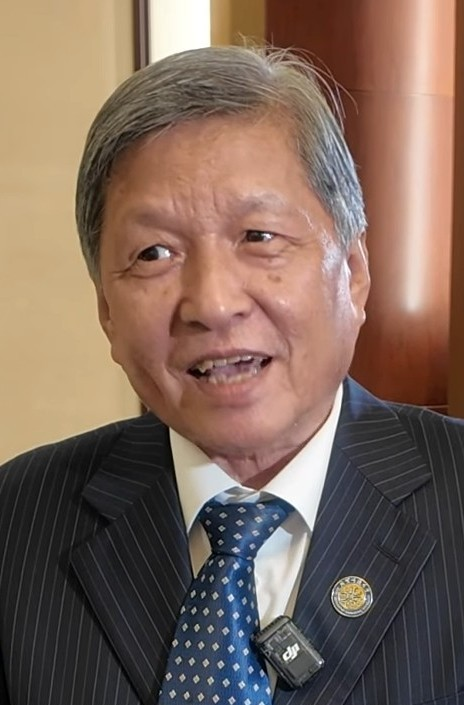
- Wang in 2025

President of Fuyao Institute of Technology
- Incumbent
- Assumed office 25 March 2024
- Preceded by: Mei Hong

President of Xi'an Jiaotong University
- In office April 2014 – 19 March 2024
- Preceded by: Zheng Nanning
- Succeeded by: Zhang Liqun

President of Harbin Institute of Technology
- In office March 2002 – April 2014
- Preceded by: Yang Shiqin
- Succeeded by: Zhou Yu

Personal details
- Born: October 1958 (age 67–68) Xian County, Hebei, China
- Party: Chinese Communist Party
- Education: Harbin Institute of Technology

Chinese name
- Simplified Chinese: 王树国
- Traditional Chinese: 王樹國
Transcriptions
Standard Mandarin
- Hanyu Pinyin: Wáng Shùguó

Wang Shuguo (Chinese: 王树国; born October 1958) is a Chinese university administrator and politician, and currently president of Fuyao University of Science and Technology.

Wang was a representative of the 10th, 11th, and 12th National Congress of the Chinese Communist Party and was a member of the Standing Committee of the 13th National People's Congress

== Biography ==
Wang was born in Xian County, Hebei, in October 1958. He earned his bachelor's degree, master's degree and doctor's degree, all from Harbin Institute of Technology.

After graduation, Wang stayed for teaching. Wang was a visiting scholar at the Arts et Métiers ParisTech between 1987 and 1989. He joined the Chinese Communist Party (CCP) in November 1976. Wang was elevated to full professor in 1993 and was promoted again to vice president 1998.

Wang got involved in politics in January 1999, when he was appointed director of the Heilongjiang Provincial Science and Technology Department.

In March 2002, Wang moved back to Harbin Institute of Technology, where he was proposed as president.

In April 2014, Wang was transferred to Xi'an Jiaotong University and appointed president.

In March 2024, Wang was recruited as the president of Fuyao Institute of Technology founded by businessman Cao Dewang.

Educational offices
Preceded by Yang Shiqin	President of Harbin Institute of Technology; 2002–2014	Succeeded by Zhou Yu
Preceded by Zheng Nanning	President of Xi'an Jiaotong University; 2014–2024	Succeeded by Zhang Liqun
Preceded by Mei Hong	President of Fuyao Institute of Technology; 2024–present	Incumbent
