= Jymoo Zhou =

Chinese artist

- Born: Hainan, China
- Known for: Installation art, Multi-media art, design, sculpture
- Website: https://shimo.im/doc/KzfxZQfBdOU5Dgw4

Jymoo Zhou is a Chinese artist based in Beijing, China. He focuses primarily on installation art projects and design at the intersection of art, environment, technology.

== Biography ==
Jymoo was raised on Hainan island in China and graduated with a degree in Life Sciences before focusing on art.

== Art work ==
Jymoo is known primarily for his installation projects. His most notable work is "Moon", a large white sphere illuminating LED light. It provided the audience with the opportunity to feel close to the moon and was displayed in a variety of locations around China including a lake, grassland, desert, square, roof and ruins. It received coverage from major media sources including Vice Media in China and Tencent QQ news.
