= Xi'an Jiaotong University =

Public Research University in Xi'an, Shaanxi, China

- 西安交通大学
- Motto: 精勤求学，敦笃励志，果毅力行，忠恕任事
- Type: Public
- Established: 1896; 130 years ago
- Affiliations: C9; Double First-Class Construction; McDonnell International Scholars Academy; University Alliance of the Silk Road; Top International Managers in Engineering (T.I.M.E.); UASR
- President: Zhang Liqun
- Faculty: 6,538
- Students: 32,000
- Location: Xi'an, Shaanxi, China; 34°14′50″N 108°58′45″E
- Website: en.xjtu.edu.cn

Chinese name
- Simplified Chinese: 西安交通大学
- Traditional Chinese: 西安交通大學
Transcriptions
Standard Mandarin
- Hanyu Pinyin: Xī'ān Jiāotōng Dàxué

Xi'an Jiaotong University (XJTU; 西安交通大学) is a public university in Xi'an, Shaanxi, China. It is affiliated with and funded by the Ministry of Education of China. The university is part of Project 211, Project 985, and the Double First-Class Construction. It is a member of the C9 League.

XJTU houses five state key laboratories, four state special laboratories, and two state engineering research centers. Two of its eight affiliated teaching hospitals are ranked among China's top 100 hospitals. It is the hub of the University Alliance of the Silk Road, an international academic alliance under the umbrella of China's Belt and Road Initiative that aims to build educational collaboration and fuel economic growth in countries along the Silk Road Economic Belt and key partners worldwide.

== History ==
In 1896, the Nanyang Public School (南洋公学) was founded in Shanghai based on an imperial edict issued by the Guangxu Emperor, under the Business and Telegraphs Office of the imperial government. Four schools were established: a normal school, a school of foreign studies, a middle school, and a high school. Sheng Xuanhuai, the mandarin who proposed the idea to the Guangxu Emperor, became the first president and is regarded as the founder of the university, along with John Calvin Ferguson, a missionary educator.

The university underwent a series of transitions. In 1904, the Ministry of Commerce took over the school, and in 1905 changed its name to Imperial Polytechnic College of the Commerce Ministry. In 1906, the college was placed under the Ministry of Posts and Telegraphs, and its name was changed to Shanghai Industrial College of the Ministry of Posts and Telegraphs. When the Republic of China was founded, the college was placed under the Ministry of Communications and its name was once again changed, this time to Government Institute of Technology of the Communications Ministry.

The Republic of China founded the School of Management in 1918. In 1920, the Government Institute of Technology of the Communications Ministry merged with two other colleges and changed its name to Nan Yang College of Chiao Tung. In 1938, the Ministry of Education took over the university and renamed it, National Chiao Tung University (Chinese: 国立交通大学). During the Second Sino-Japanese War, the university moved to the French Concession, and in 1940 the state-run branch of Jiaotong University was set up in Chongqing. In 1941, to prevent the Wang puppet government from taking over the university, it continued operations under the name of Private Nanyang University. In 1942, the Wang government took over Shanghai School. So the Education Department of Guomin Government chose Chongqing Branch as the headquarters of Jiaotong University. In 1943, the graduate school was founded. After the anti-Japanese War was won, Chongqing headquarter went back to Shanghai and merged with Shanghai School. In 1946, the name of state-run Jiaotong University was recovered.

After the Kuomintang were defeated in 1949, a part of the faculty retreated to Taiwan with Chiang Kai-shek and, in 1958, formed the eponymous National Chiao Tung University in Taiwan. The institution that remained in Shanghai was renamed Chiao Tung University to reflect the fact that all universities under the new socialist state would be public. In the 1950s, the pinyin romanization system was developed in mainland China and Chiao Tung University changed its English name to Jiao Tong University.

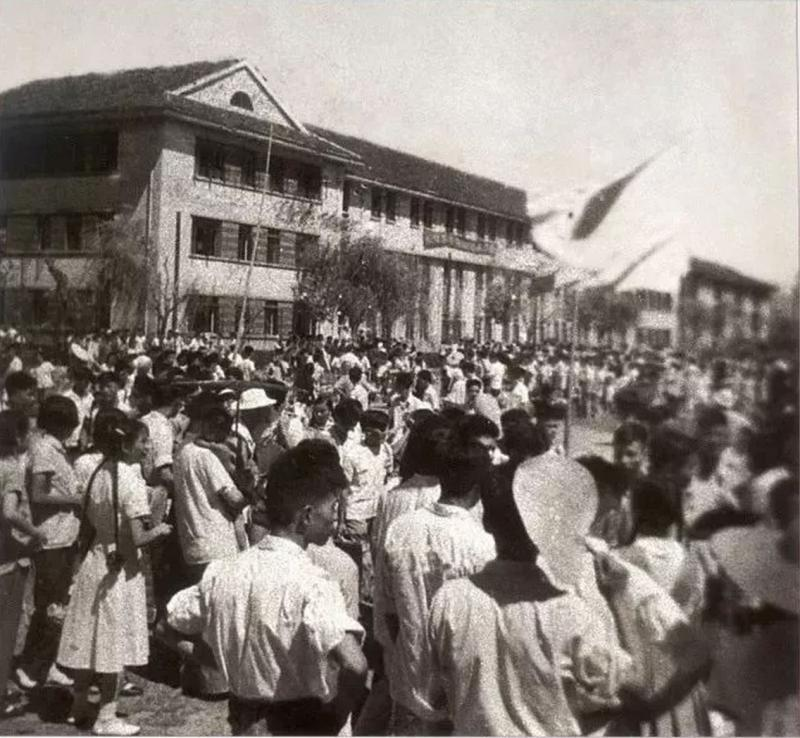
The first students and teachers started to move to Xi'an in 1956

The national strategy adopted in 1956 dictated that the majority of Jiao Tong University would be moved to Xi'an, Shaanxi (Chinese: 交通大学西迁). During the movement, the national strategy was changed and there were questions on necessity of the move. Since the majority of the facilities, staffs, faculties and students had already arrived in Xi'an and the campus had started operated, the university decided to operate two campuses, one in Xi'an and another in Shanghai. However, the operation with two campuses were difficult and moving the Xi'an campus back to Shanghai was impossible. Thus, from July 31, 1959, with the approval from State Council of the People's Republic of China, two campuses became independent. The Xi'an campus changed its name to Xi'an Jiaotong University and the Shanghai campus changed its name to Shanghai Jiao Tong University. Xi'an Jiaotong University was immediately listed as a National Key University. Later, it became one of a handful of universities built according to the "Seventh Five-Year Plan" and "Eighth Five-Year Plan." In 2000, the State Council approved a merger of Xi'an Medical University and the Shaanxi Institute of Finance and Economics into Xi'an Jiaotong University.

Xi'an Jiaotong University has been part of all major government efforts to establish world-class universities in China, including Project 211, Project 985, the C9 League, and the Double First-Class Construction (Class A). In March 2025, the university signed an agreement with the Shaanxi International Communication Center to provide a pipeline of talent.

== Faculty and staff ==
XJTU's faculty and staff of more than 5500 includes twelve members of the Chinese National Academy of Engineering, nine of whom are also members of the Chinese National Academy of Sciences; 38 Changjiang (Yangtze River) Scholars; and 25 National Science Fund for Distinguished Young Scholars award winners. From the perspective of teaching, XJTU's faculty and staff include five recipients of national teaching awards, 142 participants in the Ministry of Education's "New Century Program for Promising Young Talent", and 547 recipients of government stipends for outstanding contributions to China.

== Academics ==
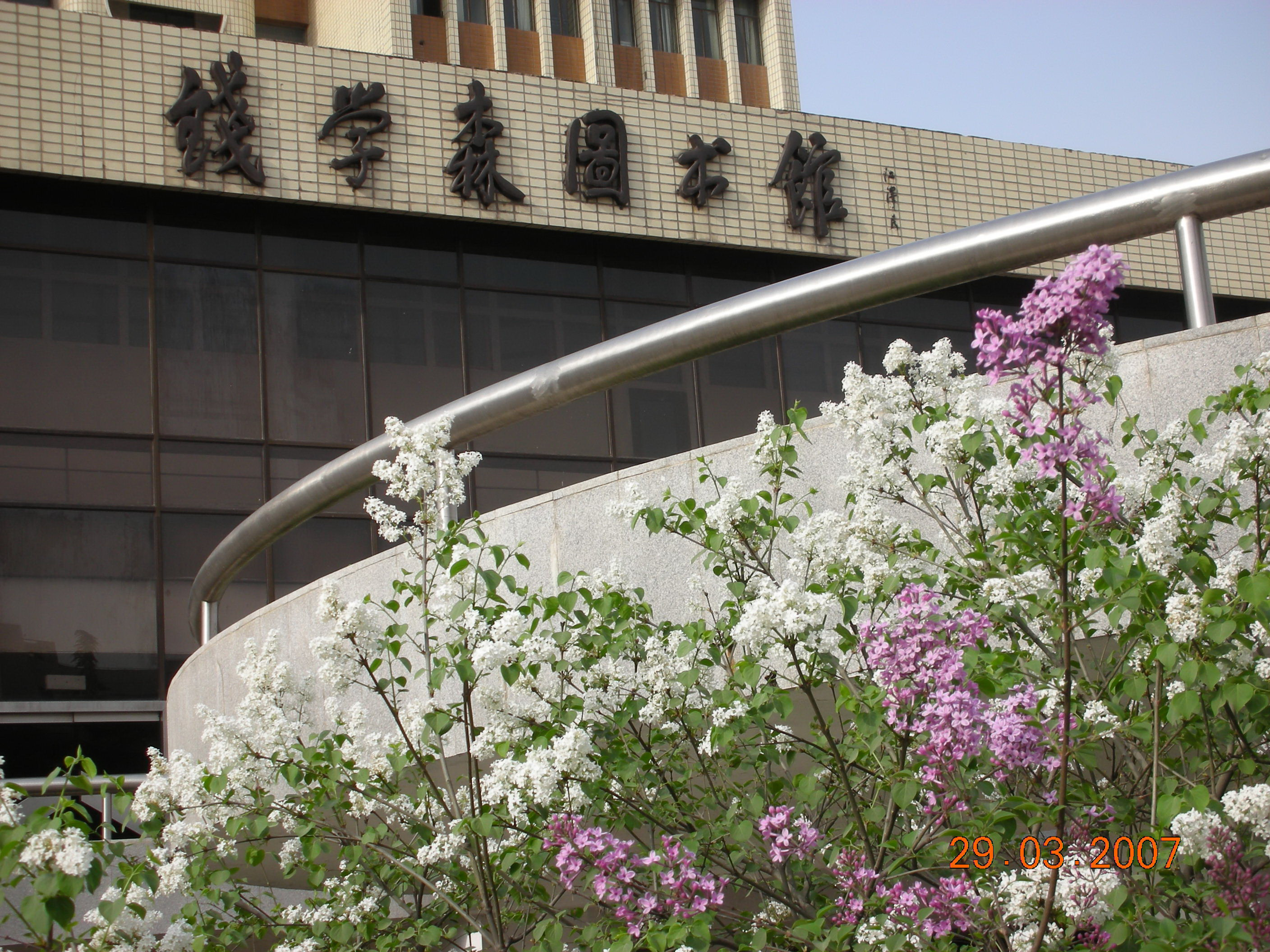
Qian Xuesen Library, the main library of the Xingqing campus

XJTU's student body comprises 30,000 people, including 15,000 graduate students. The school offers 84 undergraduate majors, 200 master's degree disciplines, and 115 doctoral disciplines. Among these, eight are designated as first-order key disciplines by the Chinese government.

=== Campus ===
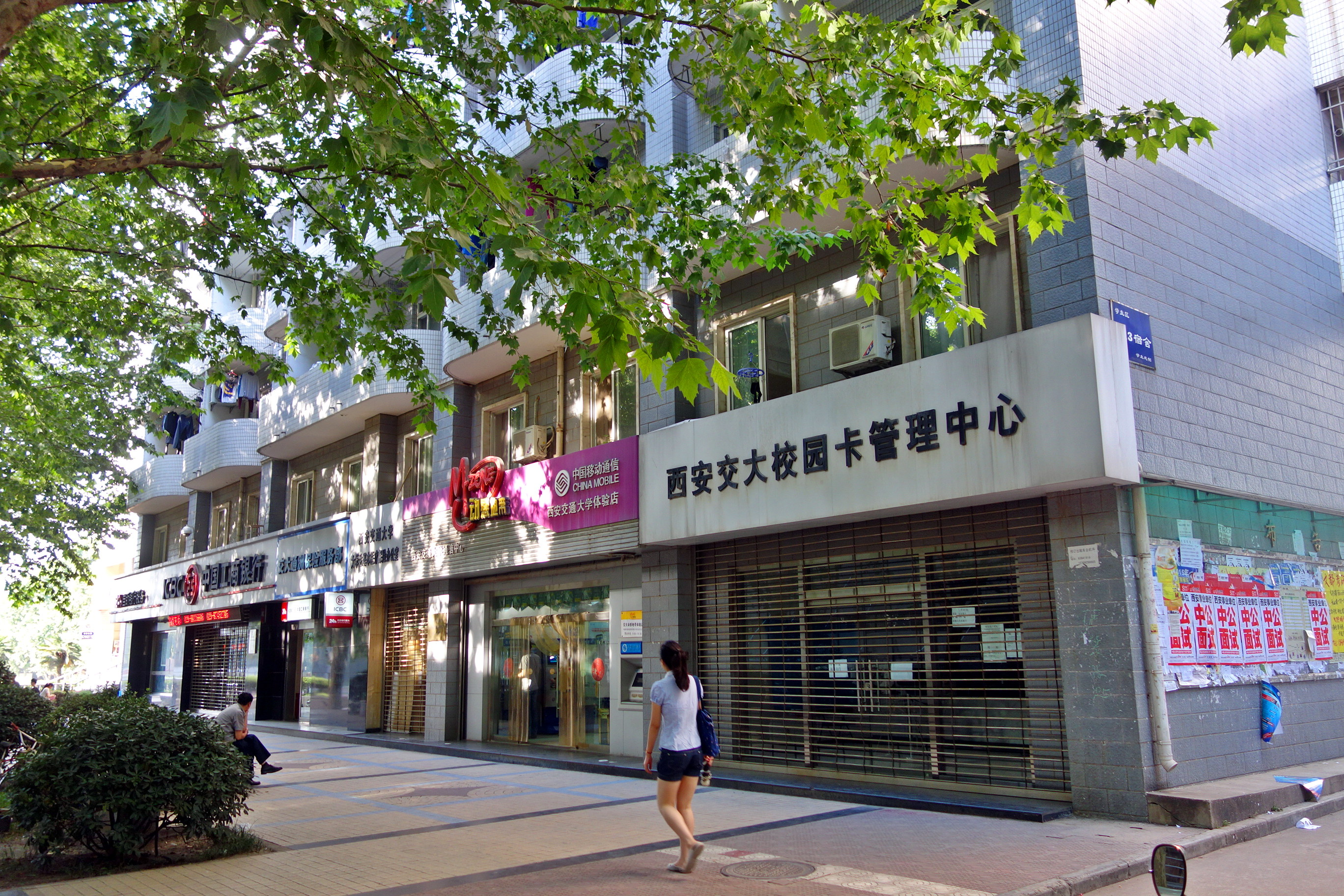
On-campus student dormitory

XJTU's four campuses (Xingqing, Yanta, Innovation Harbor, and Qujiang) cover over 250 hectares. The Qian Xuesen Library (Xingqing campus) houses 5 million books, 4,100 current periodicals, 30,000 electronic periodicals, and more than 1 million electronic books. The library's computer system is fully integrated with the campus network, CERNET, and the Internet.

=== Special Class for the Gifted Young ===
The Honors Youth Program of Xi'an Jiaotong University (Chinese: 西安交大少年班, also translated as Special Class for the Gifted Young of Xi'an Jiaotong University), established in 1985, admits 140 high school freshmen annually to coursework at High School Affiliated to Xi'an Jiaotong University, Suzhou High School-SIP, or Tianjin Nankai High School. Students who pass can matriculate to XJTU without taking the Gaokao. Students who subsequently pass their undergraduate courses can begin master's programs at XJTU without taking the Postgraduate Admission Test.

=== Internet education ===
XJTU's Internet Education School was founded in 2001 as one of 15 experimental universities approved by the Chinese Ministry of Education to establish distance education. The university partners with a number of leading universities in China for this project. XJTU was involved in a number of nationwide experiments and pilot projects including the Ministry of Education "Demonstration Project of Internet Education Based on Satellite and Terrestrial Networks"; "Tenth Five-Year Plan" key project "real-time teaching system"; and the National Science Fund projects "Study of Individual and Interactive Virtual Collaborative Learning Environment" and "Study and Application of Personality Mining in E-Learning".

=== Rankings and reputation ===
University rankings
BCUR National	Domestic	10
Wu Shulian National	Domestic	13
CUAA National	Alumni	15
QS National	General	15
THE National	General	14–19
QS Asia (Asia version)	General	72
THE Asia (Asia version)	General	41
ARWU World	Research	79
QS World	General	296
THE World	General	=196
USNWR World	General	129

XJTU is one of the elite universities in China with its status as a Double First-Class Construction university, C9 League University, and a member of the University Alliance of the Silk Road. It is the only university in Western China to be included in the C9 League and one of only two universities in the Western China region (alongside Sichuan University) that consistently rank among the top-15 comprehensive research universities nationwide.

As of 2025, Xi'an Jiaotong University was ranked among China's top-10 research comprehensive universities and ranked first in Western China region, with a combined population of almost 300 million.

For 2026, XJTU was ranked # 79 by Academic Ranking of World Universities, #129 by U.S. News & World Report Best Global University Ranking, and #124 by the Center for World University Rankings.

Xi'an Jiaotong graduates are highly desired in China and worldwide. In 2017, its Graduate Employability rankings placed at #101 in the world in the QS Graduate Employability Rankings. Internationally, XJTU is regarded as one of the most reputable Chinese universities by the Times Higher Education World Reputation Rankings where it ranked 176-200th globally.

=== Research ===
Regarding scientific research output, the Nature Index 2025 ranked XJTU the No.20 university in the Asia Pacific region, and 32nd in the world among the global universities. The 2025 CWTS Leiden Ranking ranked XJTU 8th in the world by total publications and 30th in the world based on the number of their scientific publications belonging to the top 1% in their fields for the time period 2020–2023.

=== International program ===
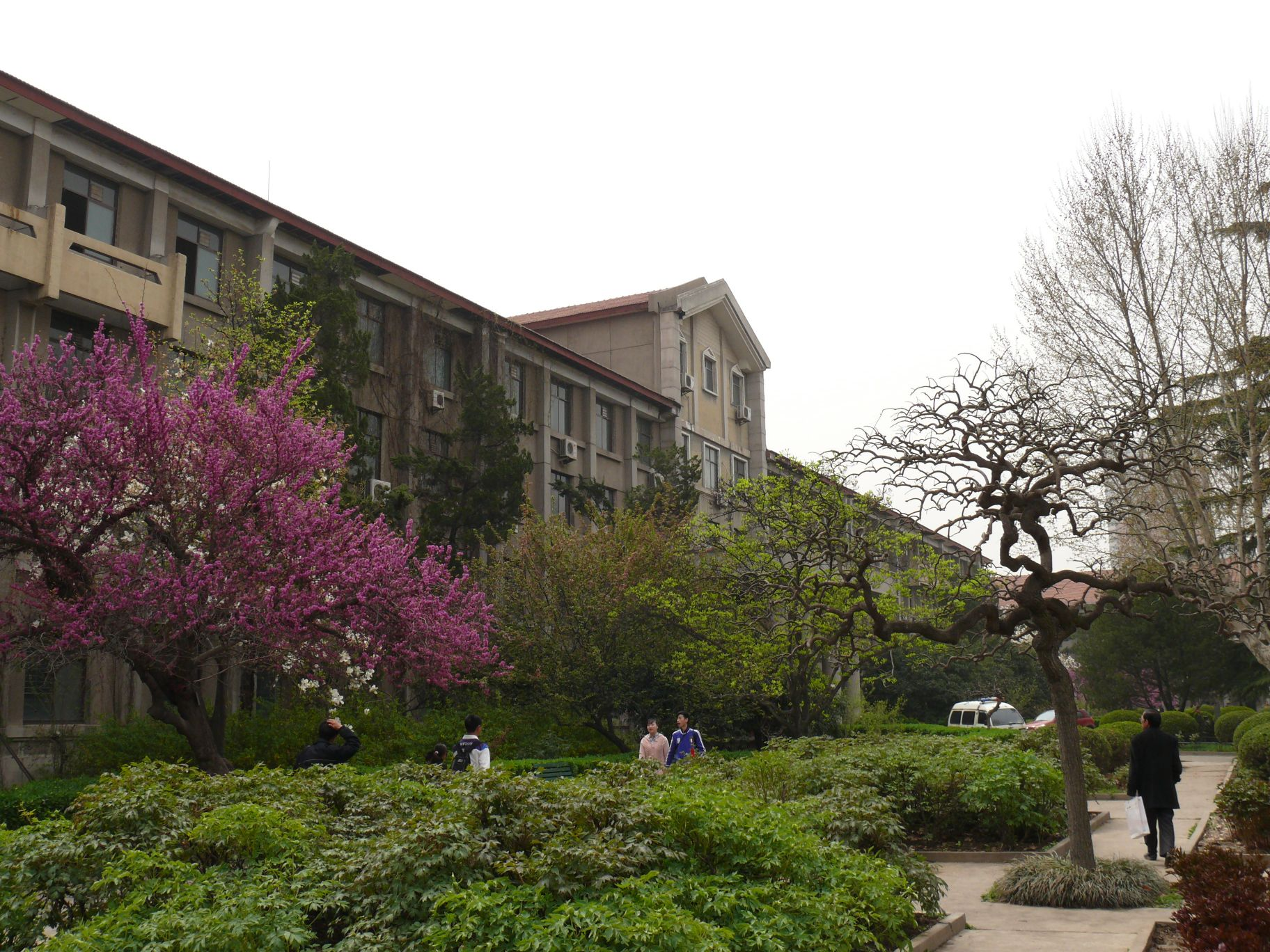
Old building in Xi'an Jiaotong University

As the major trading site of the Silk Road, Xi'an has emerged as the site of a major international university alliance associated with the One Belt, One Road initiative. The program was initiated by the principal Shuguo Wang, and it has held forums for it since 2015. The university is home to a vigorous international program of research and exchange, centered around the University Alliance of the Silk Road that was formed in 2015.

The university has partnerships with several other universities that have not been incorporated into the University Alliance of the Silk Road and Washington University in St. Louis through the McDonnell International Scholars Academy.

On September 9, 2019, XJTU-POLIMI Joint School opened as a joint school of Xi'an Jiaotong university and the Polytechnic University of Milan.

== Notable alumni ==
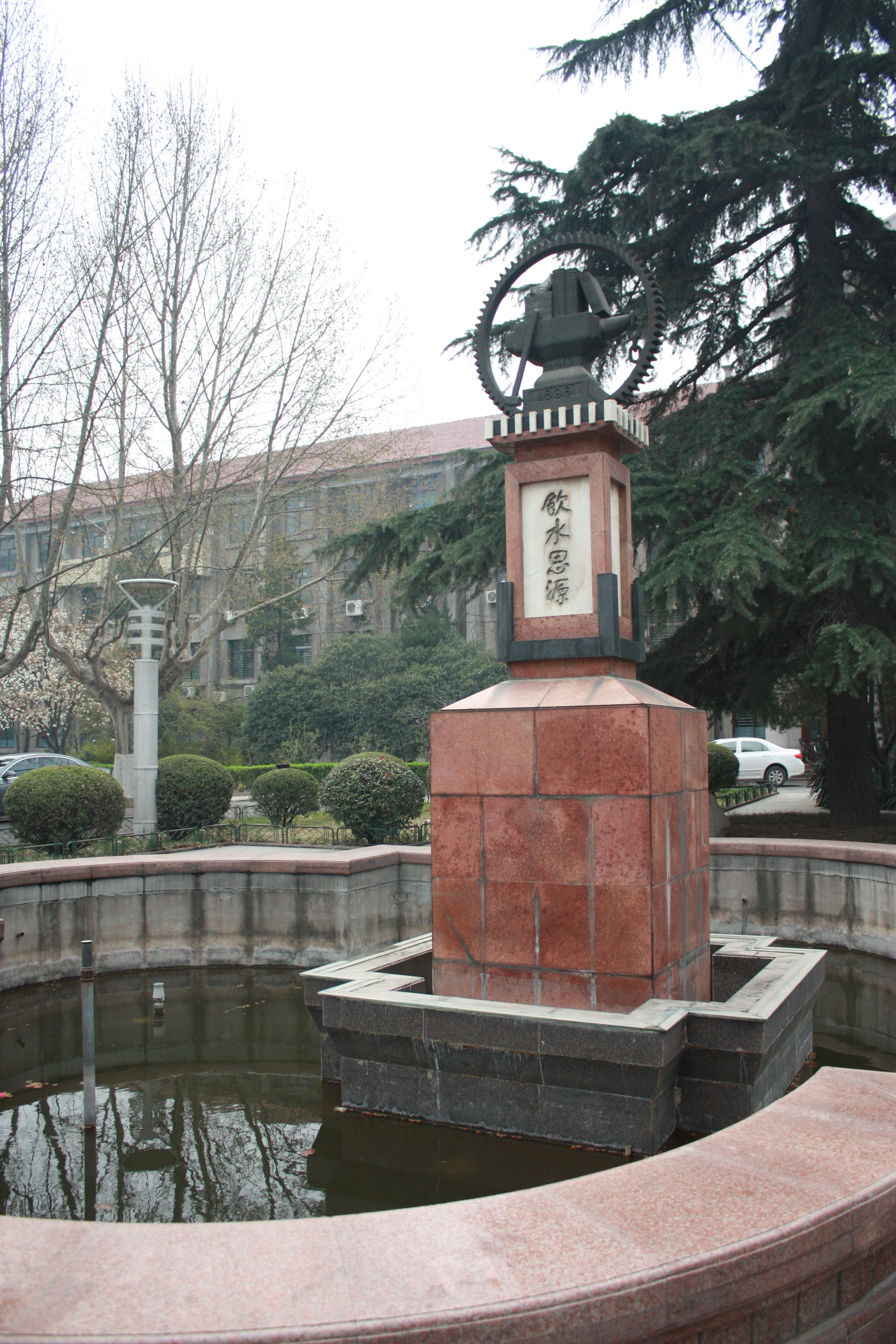
The fountain in front of the main building

Among XJTU's alumni are many renowned scholars, including Huajian Gao, Tsien Hsue-shen, Zhigang Suo, Tony Jun Huang, Changqing Chen, Xi Chen, Xi Yao, Yilu Liu, Shouren Ge (Ernest S. Kuh), Wu Wenjun, Xu Guangxian, Zhang Guangdou and An Wang.

Among XJTU's alumni are numerous famous entrepreneurs in both China and abroad, including the following:

- Zhou Hongyi, Founder and chairman of the internet anti-virus and security company Qihoo, and an alumnus of the Special Class for Gifted Youth
- Haitao Zheng, listed in MIT Technology Review's TR35 in 2005, and an alumnus of the Special Class for Gifted Youth
- Ge Honglin, CEO of the Aluminum Corporation of China Limited
- Kate Wang, Chinese billionaire businesswoman

== See also ==
- Xi'an Jiaotong-Liverpool University
- Shanghai Jiao Tong University
- Southwest Jiaotong University
- Beijing Jiaotong University
- Hingchu Chiao Tung University
- The High School Affiliated to Xi'an Jiaotong University
- Xi'an Jiaotong University Health Science Center
