= CM Browser =

Chromium-based web browser with WebKit and Trident engines

CM Browser 猎豹安全浏览器
- Developers: Cheetah Mobile（Browser） Rigo Design（Exterior）
- Initial release: May 2, 2012; 13 years ago（1.0.0.2096）

Stable release(s)
- Windows 8.0 (updated frequently). Last known confirmed release: (August 12, 2021; 4 years ago) iOS 4.20 (January 1, 2018; 8 years ago) Android 5.22.21.0051 (June 5, 2019; 6 years ago) [±]
- Written in: C++、Assembly language、JavaScript
- Engine: WebKit/Trident
- Operating system: Windows 7、Android4.0、iOS 5.0
- Size: 5-6MB
- Available in: Simplified Chinese
- Type: Web browser
- License: Freeware
- Website: www.liebao.cn (in Chinese)

CM Browser (Chinese: 猎豹安全浏览器) is a web browser developed by Cheetah Mobile. The browser is based on Chromium and supports both the WebKit and Trident browser engines. Jinshan Network claims that CM Browser is the first secure dual-engine browser with a "browser intrusion prevention system".

On June 3, 2013, CM Browser was released on Android and iOS.

== Controversies ==
Version 1 of CM Browser used version 17 of Chromium, which was well below the official version. This prevented the use of the Chrome Web Store on CM Browser.

On September 21, 2014, Jinshan was ordered to pay Youku ¥300,000 for violating Chinese competition laws by allowing CM Browser to filter video ads on Youku's website. In the preceding trial, Youku claimed to suffer an economic loss due to CM Browser's ad filtering, as the company earned revenue from ads and from premium subscriptions that allowed users to skip ads. Jinshan stated that CM Browser's ad filtering feature is vendor-neutral and that users must opt in to activate it.

In November 2018, the Shanghai Consumer Protection Committee commissioned an evaluation of the application permissions of 18 popular mobile apps, including CM Browser. The study found that CM Browser requested sensitive phone- and SMS-related permissions that allowed the browser to monitor the phone's outbound calls. A representative for CM Browser responded that the browser needed to determine whether a phone call is active to prevent interference when playing audio. The representative indicated that CM Browser would be updated to address the privacy concerns.

In February 2020, all of Cheetah's applications were pulled from the Play Store. Following that, Forbes reported that the company was spying on its users, based on a report by Gabriel Cirlig, a security researcher. The report detailed how CM Browser was sending encrypted data to its Chinese servers, exfiltrating the URLs visited by all its users and selling them to various third parties.

=== Ban in India ===
In June 2020, the Government of India banned CM Browser, along with 58 other Chinese-origin apps, citing data and privacy concerns. The border tensions in 2020 between India and China might have also played a role in the ban.

== See also ==
- 360 Secure Browser
- QQ browser
