= 360 v. Tencent =

- Court: Supreme People's Court
- Full case name: Qihoo 360 v. Tencent, Inc.
- Decided: 2016
- Citations: (2013)民三终字4号 (pinyin: (2013) Min San Zhong Zi No. 4); Stanford Law School China Guiding Cases Project, English Guiding Case (EGC78), Apr. 7, 2017 Edition

360 vs Tencent is a dispute between two Chinese IT companies, Tencent and Qihoo, over competition practices that escalated in November 2010. Hundreds of millions of users were forced to choose sides in the dispute. It is the first anti-monopoly case to be heard by the Supreme People's Court since the Anti Monopoly Law of China was promulgated.

At the time Qihoo was the producer of the anti-virus software 360 Safeguard and a competitor of QQ Doctor, which gained 40% of the Chinese market overnight when it bundled with Tencent QQ. On September 27, 2017, Qihoo released privacy guard software that showed QQ's suspicious spying activities on its users. Tencent then responded with a fabricated report alleging that Qihoo was under investigation for ads involving pornographic websites, as that Qihoo was attempting to gain support from its competitors in the anti-virus front like Baidu, Kingsoft, and Kaspersky Lab.

Tencent

Later Qihoo alleged that QQ scans the installed programs in user's computer based on a "super black list", and attacked TenCent CEO Ma Huateng, saying he had been receiving government subsidies for housing. Qihoo also updated its privacy guard software to block ads in QQ, Tencent's responded by filing an unfair competition lawsuit against Qihoo and released an update that blocked Tencent products from running on machines with 360 Safeguard installed. Hundreds of millions of Chinese computer users were forced to choose sides in the legal conflict by choosing to, either uninstall QQ or 360's privacy guard.

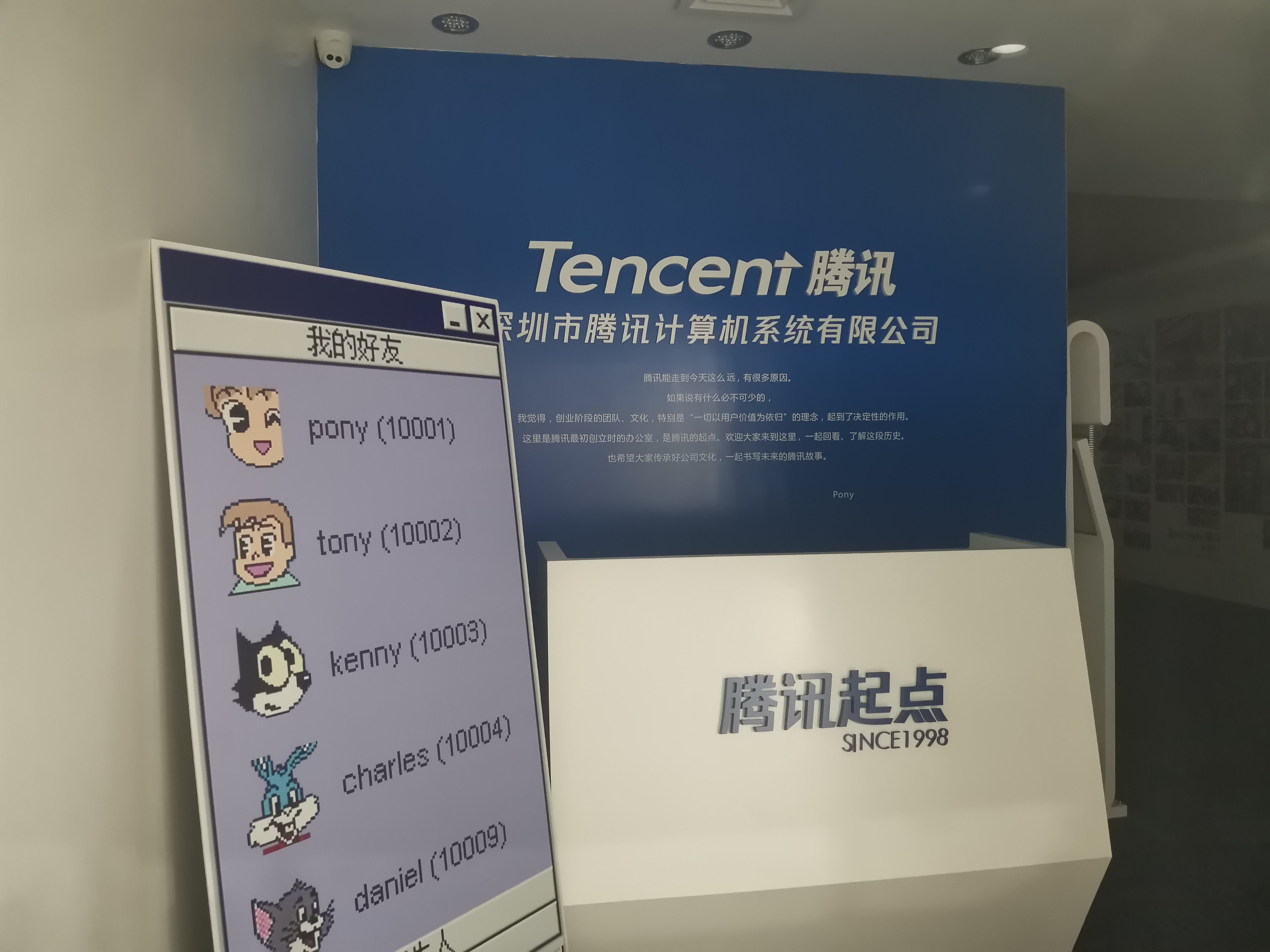

== Litigation at the Guangdong High People's Court ==
A case of "abuse of dominant market position", the first anti-monopoly law (AML) private enforcement case that was initially brought to and examined by the provincial high people's court.

The Guangdong High People's Court issued a judgment that was both controversial and highly criticized by commentators.

In their judgment they held that:

- The relevant geographic market was worldwide. This meant that companies like Facebook and Twitter, which are banned in China, were considered to be competitors of Tencent.
- The relevant market included social media sites, email service providers and others.

Tencent was found to not have abused a dominant market position.

== Litigation at the Supreme People's Court ==
Dissatisfied with the decision of the Guangdong High Court, Qihoo decided to appeal to the Supreme People's Court.

By far, the Supreme Court's written judgment is the best and most professional, both judicially and technically, judicial judgment of its kind ever amongst all AML cases in China. Given the judicial power and nature of the Supreme Court, this judgment established and reaffirmed several very important judicial rules with precedent case law effect insofar as the private enforcement of AML is concerned. These important judicial rules include:

1. reaffirms the doctrine of semper necessitas probandi incumbit ei qui agit (he who alleges must prove) with regard to the allocation of onus probandi (burden of proof) in the AML judicial case
2. defining the relevant market is not a purpose but instead rather a methodology in assessing the relevant undertaking's market power and the influence power of the alleged monopoly conduct on to the competition, as such it is not compulsory to specifically and exactly define the relevant market in every AML litigation of abuse of dominant market position
3. a hypothetical monopoly test (HMT) based on tools of SSNIP (small but significant and non-transitory increase in price) or SSNDQ (small but significant and non-transitory decrease in quality) may be conducted in defining the relevant market but should be conducted carefully with caution
4. the related market situation and technology development trend post the litigation may be taken into consideration in defining the relevant market
5. market share is not the only element in concluding a dominant market position
6. multi-elements should be comprehensively evaluated in defining the dominant market position, including but not limited to:
  1. the market share of the undertaking in question and the competition situation of the said market;
  2. the control ability of the undertaking in question in the said market;
  3. the financial and technical status of the undertaking in question;
  4. the degree of dependence of other undertakings on the undertaking in question; and
  5. the degree of difficulty to access to the relevant market by other undertakings
7. if the relevant market is clearly defined and the alleged undertaking does not have dominant market position, normally it is not necessary to conduct an abuse behavior analysis and it can be directly concluded that such undertaking did not have abuse behavior; however, if neither the boundary of the relevant market nor the dominant market position of the alleged undertaking is clear or if the alleged undertaking had dominant market position, "effect examination" may be carried out so as to determine if the alleged conduct was lawful or not
8. the "tie-in" under the AML is illegal if it meets all of these criteria:
  1. the base product and the "tie-in" product are independent to each other,
  2. ) the undertaking has a dominant market position in the base product market,
  3. certain enforcement implemented upon the buyer who became lack of other options but to accept the tie-in product,
  4. the tie-in could not be justified and was contrary to the commercial or consumer practice or ignored the functionalities of the products, and
  5. the tie-in gave rise to a negative effect to the competition
9. if an undertaking successfully proved the alleged monopoly conduct was justifiable under AML does not mean such undertaking has automatically and same successfully proved the monopoly conduct has not caused negative effect of exclusion or restriction of competition.

== Designation as a guiding case ==
Qihoo v Tencent was designated as a guiding case by the Supreme People's Court. While China does not have case law guiding cases can be considered to be persuasive precedents.

== Reactions ==
Yu Fei, CEO of Langezhiyang International Sales Consultant Principal, speculates that the dispute resulted from poor competitive strategy.

In a poll conducted by Sina, 1.06 million users, or 79% of the participants, agree that the two companies "care more about their business interests than about their users."

Kingsoft and Kaspersky made their security services free for one year shortly after the dispute escalated.

On November 4, 2010, the day after Tencent stopped messaging service on computers with 360 installed, TencentHolding (SEHK: 700) lost 10.6 billion HKD, or 3.1% in market capitalization, including 1.1 billion HKD for Tencent CEO Ma Huateng. Kingsoft (SEHK: 3888) jumped 17.86% and gained 784 million HKD in market cap. Another instant messaging software producer Beijing Shenzhou Taiyue Software Corp., Ltd (Shenzhou Taiyue) (SZSE: 300002) increased by 3.7%.

Microsoft's MSN may be seen as the winner of this dispute, as it agreed to integrate their products with Sina "in areas including microblogging, blogging, instant messaging, information content and mobile services."

On November 10, 2010, Qihoo 360 said they are going to resume their product's compatibility with QQ.
