= RLX =

RLX may refer to:

- Acura RLX, an automobile produced by Honda for the US market
- RLX Technologies, a computer hardware company
- RLX Technology, a Chinese e-cigarette company founded by Kate Wang
