= Nano-Structures & Nano-Objects =

Peer-reviewed scientific journal

- Discipline: Nanotechnology
- Language: English
- Edited by: Sabu Thomas

Publication details
- History: 2015–present
- Publisher: Elsevier (Netherlands)
- Impact factor: waiting

Standard abbreviations
- ISO 4: Nano-Struct. Nano-Objects

Indexing
- ISSN: 2352-507X (print); 2352-5088 (web)

Links
- Journal homepage

Nano-Structures & Nano-Objects is an interdisciplinary peer-reviewed scientific journal devoted to all aspects of the synthesis and properties of the nanotechnology. The journal focuses on novel architecture at the nanolevel with an emphasis on new synthesis and characterization methods. The journal focused on objects rather than on their application. However, various novel applications (nano-electronics, energy conversion, catalysis, drug delivery and nano-medicine) using Nanostructures and Nano-objects are considered in this journal.

The journal is published by Elsevier and publishes four volumes per year.

== Editor-in-Chief ==
Sabu Thomas is the current Editor-in-Chief of the Nano-Structures & Nano-Objects.

== Indexing ==
The journal is indexed in the Scopus, INSPEC, and PubMed.
