= Anti-Monopoly Law of China =

Competition law of the People's Republic of China

The Anti-Monopoly Law of China (Chinese: 反垄断法; pinyin: Fǎn Lǒngduàn Fǎ) is the main legal statute that regulates competition law in the People's Republic of China. The National People's Congress passed it in 2007 and it came into effect on 1 August 2008.

The Anti-Monopoly Law provides a basis for investigating unreasonable intellectual property licensing fees.

== History ==
China's first comprehensive antitrust law was the Anti-Monopoly law which was passed in 2007 and became effective in 2008.

In June 2022, the final version of the revised Anti-Monopoly Law (AML) was released by the Standing Committee of the National People's Congress (NPCSC) of China. It specifically targets anti-competitive behavior facilitated by the application of technology, significantly increases the maximum fines for violations, and aims to prevent abuses by administrative organizations.

== Enforcement ==
Before 2018, regulatory power for enforcing the Anti-Monopoly Law was split between the Ministry of Commerce (which regulated mergers), the National Development and Reform Commission (NDRC) (which conducted price-related antitrust investigations), and the State Administration for Industry and Commerce (which conducted non-price related antitrust investigations). Regulatory duties overlapped, and there was bureaucratic competition between these government bodies.

In 2018, the State Administration for Market Regulation was created, and it became China's primary antitrust regulator. It continues to have some overlap of responsibilities with the NDRC and the Ministry of Industry and Information Technology.

=== Qualcomm ===
In February 2015, the National Development and Reform Commission (NDRC) completed an investigation into Qualcomm, finding that they violated the Anti-Monopoly Law by imposing unreasonable requirements for patent licensing. The fine imposed on Qualcomm was equivalent to US$975 million.

== See also ==
- Law of the People's Republic of China
- 360 v. Tencent
