= University Alliance of the Silk Road =

International network of universities connected to the Silk Road Economic Belt

- 丝绸之路大学联盟
- Founded: 2015; 11 years ago
- Headquarters: Xi'an Jiaotong University
- Region served: Worldwide; 32 countries and regions
- Members: 132 universities
- Website: uasr.xjtu.edu.cn

Chinese name
- Simplified Chinese: 丝绸之路大学联盟
- Traditional Chinese: 絲綢之路大學聯盟
Transcriptions
Standard Mandarin
- Hanyu Pinyin: Sīchóu Zhī Lù Dàxué Liánméng

The University Alliance of the Silk Road (UASR) is an academic arm to the People's Republic of China's One Belt, One Road foreign policy initiative. The UASR is a non-profit university alliance based at Xi'an Jiaotong University, a C9 League university in Western China. The mission of the UASR is to build educational collaboration and promote economic growth in countries along the Silk Road Economic Belt.

== History ==
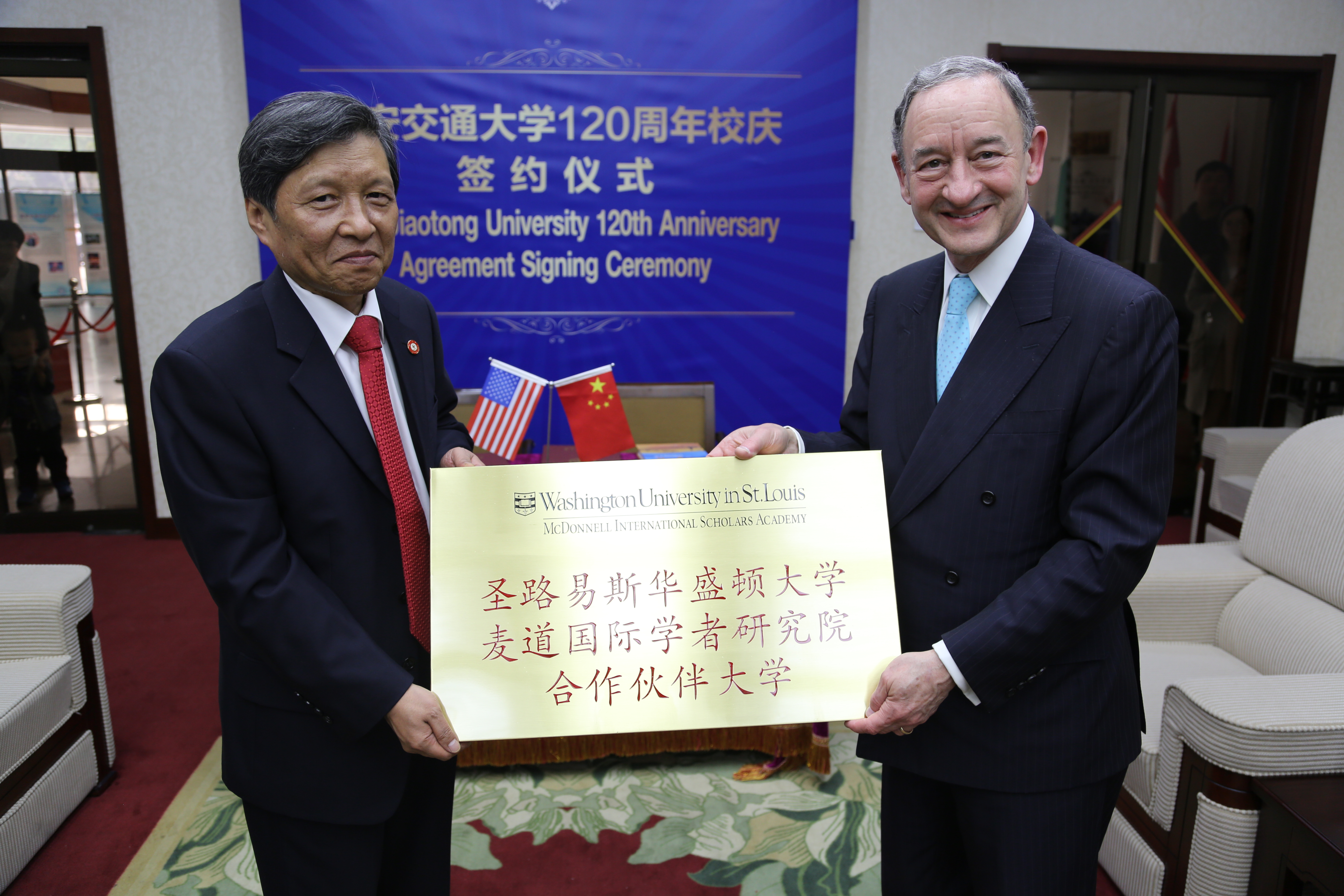
Xi'an Jiaotong University President Wang Shuguo exchanges a pai bian signboard with Washington University in St. Louis Chancellor Mark S. Wrighton after signing an agreement.

The UASR was founded in 2015 with approximately 100 universities from 22 countries. It currently includes 132 universities across 32 countries and regions on 5 continents. The program has become a central part of the 2016 plan of the Ministry of Education of the People's Republic of China for educational development along the Belt and Road region via student exchange and joint research.

== Scope ==
The UASR was charged with supporting training, research, policy, cross-cultural understanding, and medical service. The UASR includes an international alliance of law schools, which Xi'an Jiaotong president Wang Shuguo notes aims "to promote the exchanges of law among the alliance member countries and focus on legal consensus, in order to serve the Belt and Road development with legal spirit and legal culture." In addition, the UASR sponsors international cultural events including the UASR Educational Exhibition and Cultural Festival.

== Members ==
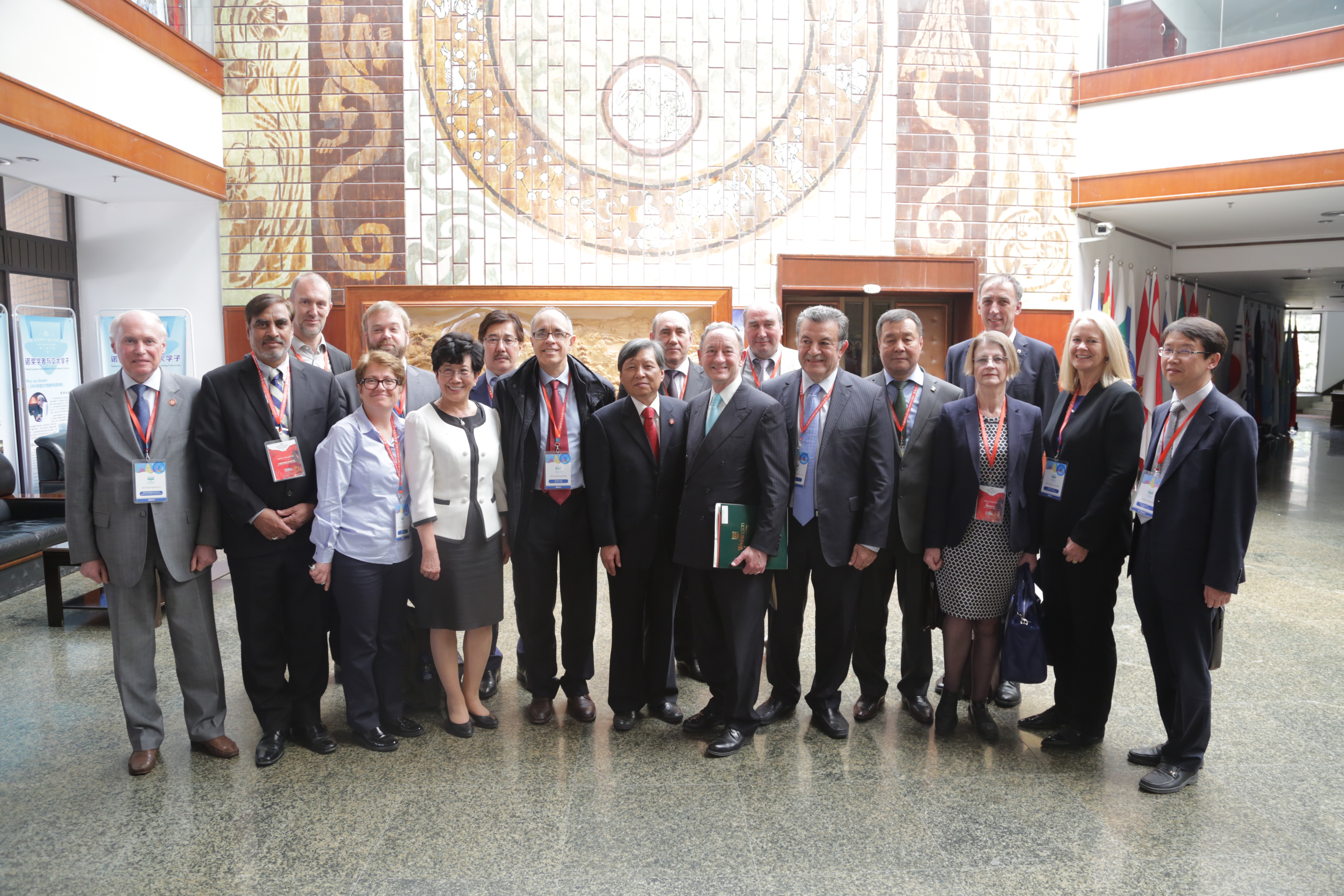
Group photo of the Silk Road Alliance Board of Directors

Notable member universities include the following:

=== Africa ===
Country/Region	Institution
Egypt	Banha University; The American University in Cairo

=== Americas ===
Country/Region	Institution
Canada	University of Saskatchewan
Peru	Peruvian University of Applied Sciences
United States	California State University, Northridge; Washington University in St. Louis

=== Asia ===
Country/Region	Institution
China	Beijing International Studies University; Harbin Institute of Technology; Lanzhou University; Minzu University of China; Northwest A&F University; Northwest University; Xi’an Jiaotong-Liverpool University; Xi’an Jiaotong University; Xidian University
Hong Kong	Chinese University of Hong Kong; City University of Hong Kong; The University of Hong Kong; Hong Kong Polytechnic University
Iran	Iran University of Science and Technology; Razi University
Jordan	Al al-Bayt University
Kazakhstan	Al-Farabi Kazakh National University; Nazarbayev University
Azerbaijan	Baku Slavic University
Macau	University of Macau
Malaysia	University of Technology Malaysia
Pakistan	National University of Sciences and Technology
Singapore	National University of Singapore
South Korea	Hanyang University; Kyungpook National University; Pusan National University
Taiwan	Yuan Ze University
Thailand	Chiang Mai University
Turkey	Hacettepe University; Sabancı University

=== Europe ===
Country/Region	Institution
Belgium	University of Antwerp
Croatia	University of Zagreb
Finland	Tampere University of Technology
France	Centrale-Supélec; École centrale de Marseille; École des ponts ParisTech; Emlyon Business School; Neoma Business School; SKEMA Business School
Germany	Technische Universität Berlin
Italy	Politecnico di Milano; University of Pavia; University of Torino
Poland	University of Gdańsk; Vistula University
Romania	Gheorghe Asachi Technical University of Iași
Russia	Far Eastern Federal University; ITMO University; Moscow Institute of Physics and Technology; National Research Nuclear University; Peter the Great St. Petersburg Polytechnic University
Spain	Universidad Católica San Antonio de Murcia
United Kingdom	University of Aberdeen; University of Liverpool

=== Oceania ===
Country/Region	Institution
Australia	Charles Darwin University; University of New South Wales; University of Queensland
New Zealand	Victoria University of Wellington; Waikato Institute of Technology

== Physical location ==
The UASR is headquartered in the Xi'an Jiaotong University's China Western Science and Technology Innovation Harbor (西安交通大学中国西部科技创新港), with space designed to promote collaborations with partner universities in university-level exchanges, talent education, and scientific research, and of building international think-tanks.
