= Razi University =

Public university in Kermanshah, Iran

- دانشگاه رازي
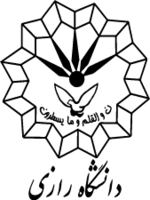
- Motto: اخلاق محور و پیشرو در تحقق جامعه دانش بنیان
- Type: Public
- Established: 1971; 55 years ago
- Founder: Dr. Abdolali Gouya
- Affiliations: UASR
- President: Jamal Fathollahi
- Faculty: 450
- Students: 12,227
- Undergraduates: 7,987
- Postgraduates: 3,875
- Location: Kermanshah, Iran; 34°23′25″N 47°06′40″E
- Campus: Urban
- News: Razi Press
- Colors: Kermanshah Blue
- Website: Razi University

Razi University (Persian: دانشگاه رازی, Daneshgah-e Razi) is a public university based in Kermanshah, Iran. The school's Science and Engineering Departments attract Iranian high school graduates as well as graduate school applicants with a majority admitted from western provinces.

The university has almost 13,000 students, enrolled in bachelor's (B.A., B.S.), master's (M.A., M.S.), and Ph.D. programs.

== Name ==
The university is named after Abu Bakr al-Razi (also known by his Latinized name Rhazes), one of the Iranian scholars of the third century.

== History ==
The university's first faculty, the Faculty of Science, was first founded in 1972 by Dr. Abdolali Gouya. At the beginning of 1972–73 academic year and with 200 students in physics, chemistry, biology, and math, the university and the faculty began working.

With the establishment of the Faculty of Medicine in Kermanshah, Faculty of Teacher Training in Sanandaj, and the Faculty of Veterinary Medicine in Ilam, Razi University expanded.

After the Islamic Revolution, the aforementioned faculties separated into Kermanshah University of Medical Sciences, University of Kurdistan, and University of Ilam, respectively.

== Faculties ==
Razi University comprises 12 faculties and campuses:

=== Faculty of Literature and Humanities ===
Faculty of Literature and Humanities was established in 1988 on the current location of the Faculty of Social Sciences, with only Persian Language and Literature as program. With expansion of the faculty and introduction of new schools, and independence of the Faculty of Social Sciences in 2007, the faculty moved to its current location on Taq-e Bostan campus. The faculty includes seven departments:

- Department of Theology
- Department of Persian Language and Literature
- Department of Arabic Language and Literature
- Department of English Language and Literature
- Department of Geography
- Department of Islamic Studies
- Department of Law, History and Archaeology

=== Faculty of Chemistry ===
The Faculty of Chemistry was founded as Department of Chemistry in 1974 on the Faculty of Science campus. The faculty has seven departments:

- Department of Organic Chemistry
- Department of Applied Chemistry
- Department of Analytical Chemistry
- Department of Inorganic Chemistry
- Department of Physical Chemistry
- Department of Nano Science and Technology

=== Faculty of Physical Education and Sport Science ===
Source:

=== Faculty of Science ===
This faculty was founded as the first faculty of the Razi University in 1972.

- Department of Statistics
- Department of Mathematics
- Department of Biology
- Department of Physics

=== Faculty of Social Sciences ===
It was separated from Literature and Humanities in 2007 and is currently located on 3 hectares (7.4 acres) campus in Beheshti Boulevard, and includes eight departments:

- Department of Political Science
- Department of Economy
- Department of Social Science
- Department of Consulting
- Department of Information and Knowledge Science
- Department of Psychology
- Department of Entrepreneurship and Management
- Department of Accounting

=== Faculty of Engineering ===
The construction of the Faculty of Engineering started in 1989. It includes:

- School of Chemical Engineering
- School of Civil Engineering
- School of Computer Engineering
- Department of Electrical Engineering
- Department of Architectural Engineering
- Department of Mechanical Engineering
- Department of Materials and Textile Engineering

=== Faculty of Advanced Technology and Science ===
- Department of Advanced Computer Systems Engineering
- Department of Nanobiotechnology
- Department of Interdisciplinary Science

=== Campus of Agriculture and Natural Resources ===
The Campus of Agriculture and Natural Resources is among the oldest parts of Razi University, which started its activities as an agricultural school in 1981. Following the expansion of departments and majors, it was promoted to a faculty, and in 2011 it became a campus with three schools:

- School of Science and Agricultural Engineering
  - Department of Water Engineering
  - Department of Animal Science
  - Department of Agronomy and Plant Genetics
- School of Agriculture
  - Department of Biosystems Mechanical Engineering
  - Department of Phytopathology
  - Department of Soil Science and Engineering
  - Department of Natural Resources
  - Department of Training and Promotion of Agriculture
- School of Veterinary Medicine
  - Department of Clinical Science
  - Department of Basic Science and Pathobiology

=== Javanrud Campus of Management ===
- Department of Business Administration
- Department of Financial Management
- Department of Accounting

=== Sonqor Campus of Agriculture ===
- Department of Biosystems Mechanics Engineering
- Department of Agricultural Mechanization Engineering
- Department of Food Industry Machinery Engineering

=== Eslamabad Campus of Engineering ===
- Department of Industrial Engineering
- Department of Computer Engineering
- Department of Architectural Engineering

== Research and Educational Centers ==
At present, Razi University comprises following centers:

1. Razi Center for Architectural and Urban Planning Studies (RCAUPS)
2. Center for Urban Studies (CUS)
3. APA Center for Cybersecurity Incidents
4. Razi University Language Center (RULC)
5. Razi University Language Proficiency Test (RULPT)
6. Enterprise Architecture Lab (EAL)
7. Cloud Computing Research Center (CCRC)
8. Center for Environmental Studies (CES)
9. Razi Institute for Telecom Research (RITR)

== International Journals ==
1. Advanced Technologies in Water Efficiency
2. Advances in Nanochemistry
3. Aging Psychology
4. Agrotechniques in Industrial Crops
5. Biodiversity and Animal Taxonomy
6. Cereal Biotechnology and Biochemistry
7. Education and Management of Entrepreneurship
8. Geography and Sustainability of Environment
9. International Political Economy Studies
10. Journal of Applied Research in Water and Wastewater
11. Journal of Catalyst and Reaction Engineering
12. Journal of Workbook of Literary Texts in the Iraqi Period
13. Mesopotamian Political Studies
14. Public Sector Economics
15. Research in Comparative Literature
16. Research in Western Iranian Languages and Dialects
17. Research on Fictional Literature
18. Technology Assisted Language Education

== See also ==
- List of Iranian Research Centers
- Higher education in Iran
- Academy of Gondishapur
- Nizamiyya
- Darolfonoon
- List of Iranian scientists from the pre-modern era.
- Modern Iranian scientists and engineers
- Education in Iran
- National Library of Iran
