= Tony Jun Huang =

- 黄俊
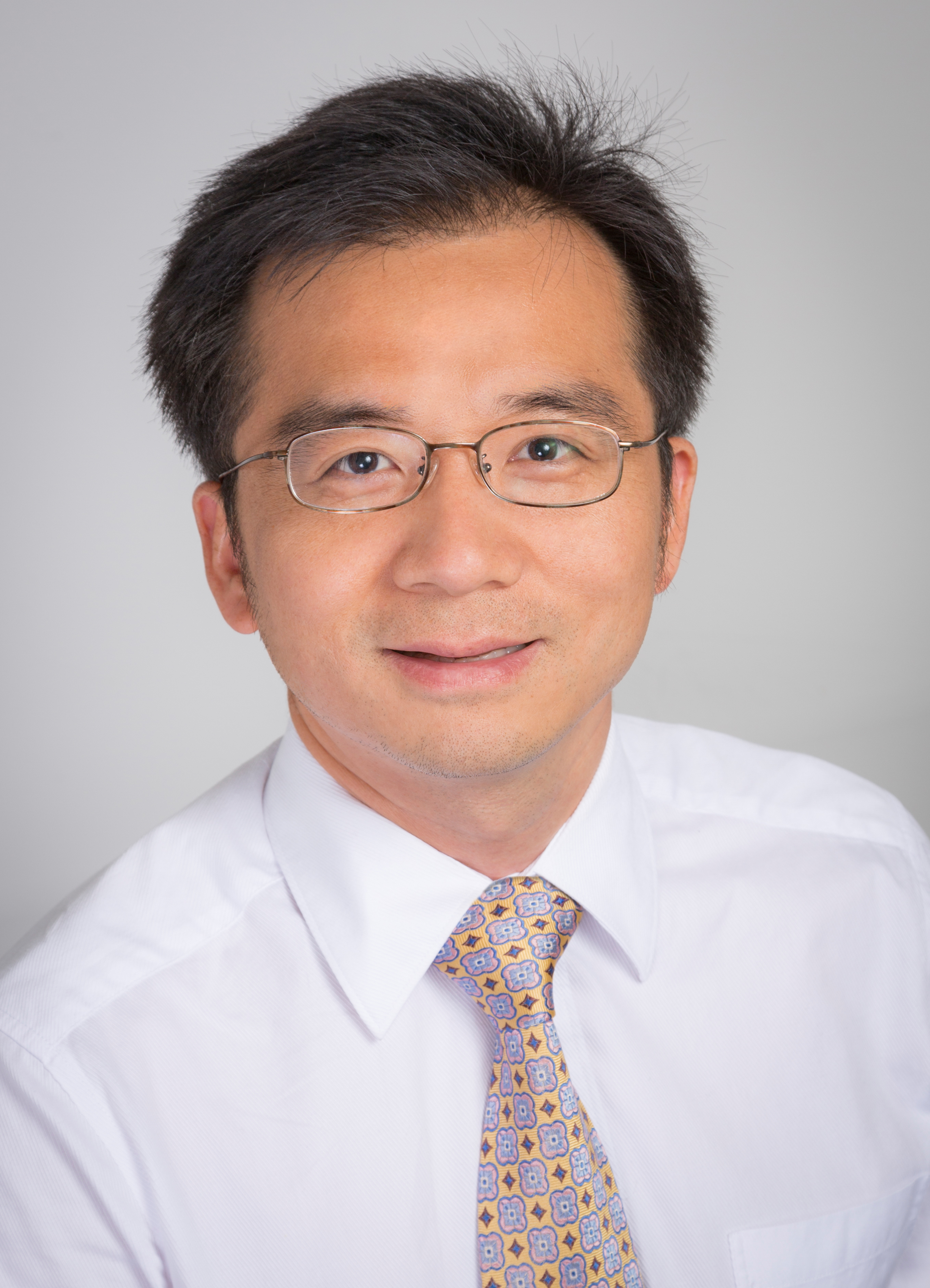
- Professor Huang in 2014
- Scientific career
- Fields: Acoustics; Acoustofluidics; Microfluidics; Lab on a chip; Optofluidics
- Institutions: Duke University
- Website: mems.duke.edu/faculty/tony-jun-huang; acoustofluidics.pratt.duke.edu

Tony Jun Huang (Chinese: 黄俊) is the William Bevan Distinguished Professor of Mechanical Engineering and Materials Science at Duke University, United States.

Huang is an expert in the fields of acoustofluidics, optofluidics, and micro/nano systems for biomedical diagnostics and therapeutics. He is widely recognized for his breakthroughs in developing acoustic tweezer technologies to manipulate nanoparticles (such as exosomes), cells and microorganisms in complex biofluids and applying acoustic tweezer technologies to various fields in biology and medicine.

Prior to joining Duke, Huang was the Huck Distinguished Chair in Bioengineering Science and Mechanics at Penn State. He received his Ph.D. degree in Mechanical and Aerospace Engineering from the UCLA, and earned undergraduate and master's degrees at Xi'an Jiaotong University.

Huang has authored/co-authored over 300 peer-reviewed journal publications in these fields. His journal articles have been cited more than 38000 times, as documented at Google Scholar (h-index: 104). He also has 26 issued or pending US/international patents. Prof. Huang was elected a fellow (member) of the National Academy of Inventors (USA) and the European Academy of Sciences and Arts. He was also a fellow of the following six professional societies: the American Association for the Advancement of Science (AAAS), the American Institute for Medical and Biological Engineering (AIMBE), the American Society of Mechanical Engineers (ASME), the Institute of Electrical and Electronics Engineers (IEEE), the Institute of Physics (UK), and the Royal Society of Chemistry (UK).

Huang's research has received the 2010 National Institutes of Health (NIH) Director's New Innovator Award, a 2011 Penn State Engineering Alumni Society Outstanding Research Award, 2011&2013&2016 JALA Top Ten Breakthroughs of the Year Award, a 2012 Outstanding Young Manufacturing Engineer Award from the Society for Manufacturing Engineering, a 2013 Faculty Scholar Medal from Pennsylvania State University, a 2013 American Asthma Foundation (AAF) Scholar Award, the 2014 IEEE Sensors Council Technical Achievement Award from the Institute of Electrical and Electronics Engineers (IEEE), the 2017 Analytical Chemistry Young Innovator Award from the American Chemical Society (ACS), the 2019 Van C. Mow Medal from the American Society of Mechanical Engineers (ASME), and the 2019 Technical Achievement Award from the IEEE Engineering in Medicine and Biology Society (EMBS).
