= Zhang Liqun =

President of South China University of Technology

Zhang Liqun (Chinese: 张立群) is the president of Xi'an Jiaotong University since March 2024. He was former president of the South China University of Technology from 2022 to 2024.

== Education ==
Zhang obtained his BS (1990), MS (1992), and PhD (1995) degrees from the Beijing University of Chemical Technology. He was a visiting scholar at the University of Akron in Ohio from 1990 to 2000 and a postdoctoral researcher at Case Western Reserve University in Ohio from 2000 to 2001.

== Career ==
Zhang has been a professor at the College of Materials Science and Engineering (CMSE) at the Beijing University of Chemical Technology since 1995, and College Dean since 2016.

He began to serve as president of the South China University of Technology in 2021. During his tenure, the university has established partnerships with BASF, with the Nanyang Technological University of Singapore, and with Mahidol University.

Zhang is a member of the editorial board of the scientific journal Nano-Structures and Nano-Objects.

His most cited work concerns the application of a Halloysite clay nanotube to achieve a delayed release of antioxidants in a rubber compound, thus achieving an enhancement to anti-ageing properties.

== Awards and recognition ==
- 2012 - Sparks–Thomas award from the ACS Rubber Division.
- 2012 - SCEJ Asia Research Award, The Society of Chemical Engineering, Japan
- 2014 - Morand Lambla Award from International Polymer Processing Society
- 2021 - Colwyn medal of the IOM3
- 2021 - Fellow of the Chinese Academy of Engineering
