= 360 Secure Browser =

Multi-platform web browser

- 360 Secure Browser on Windows 11
- Developer: Qihoo 360
- Release: July 2008; 18 years ago

Stable release(s)
- 13.1.5101.0 / 27 December 2021; 4 years ago

Preview release(s)
- 10.1.2245.0 (October 25, 2019; 6 years ago) [±] 11.0.2251.0 (November 15, 2019; 6 years ago) [±] 12.2.1940.0 (March 19, 2021; 5 years ago) [±] 12.3.1664.0 (January 16, 2021; 5 years ago 12.2.1654.0 (December 21, 2021; 4 years ago) [±] 5.2.0 (November 15, 2021; 4 years ago) [±]) [±]
- Engine: Blink, Trident
- Operating system: Windows, macOS; Android, iOS
- Available in: Chinese, English
- Type: Web browser
- License: Proprietary freeware
- Website: mse.360.cn; browser.360.cn/se/en.html

360 Secure Browser (360 Security Browser) or 360 Safe Browser (Chinese: 360安全浏览器) is a freeware web browser developed by the Qihoo company of Beijing, China. Version 1.0 was released in July 2008 (first non-beta release; first beta in changelog is from April).

The browser by default renders the webpage using the Blink-based engine Google Chrome, and when running in compatibility mode, it renders webpages using the Trident engine found in Internet Explorer.

Webkit-based engine was introduced in 2010 (dual-engine with Trident), as the 360 Extreme Browser (Chinese: 360极速浏览器). In the 360 Secure Browser it was added in 2012, in version 6.

== Market share ==
In January 2011, Qihoo claimed that it was the second most popular web browser in China (after Internet Explorer), with 172 million monthly active users, 44.1% of Internet users in China. StatCounter claims that the true figure is between 2–7%. As of November 2014 StatCounter reported that the Qihoo browser was the 5th most popular browser in the United States. Its main competitors in China are the Sogou High-Speed Browser (搜狗高速浏览器) by Sogou, CM Browser, QQ Browser by Tencent, Baidu Browser and Maxthon.

As of 2017, the latest versions of 360 Secure Browser do not offer a distinguishable user-agent string. It spoofs itself either as Google Chrome or Internet Explorer, making it difficult for developers to target or identify.

== Controversies ==
In 2012, a whistleblower reported a hidden backdoor in 360 Secure Browser. The Product Director of 360 Secure Browser, Tao Weihua, accused the whistleblower of "smearing 360 on behalf of Baidu", which the whistleblower said was "the worst professional response in history". Independent analysis of the claim showed that the browser has an "undeclared mechanism (i.e., via ExtSmartWiz.dll) which connects to the server on a regular basis (e.g., every 5 minutes), and allows it to download files of any type (including executables) from the server."

This and other controversies surrounding Qihoo eventually led to the temporary pulling of their products from the iOS App Store.

High usage numbers may be due to the browser being difficult to uninstall, its parent product 360 Safeguard frequently recommending it and a warning pop-up that appears when a user attempts to install another browser, falsely claiming that the other browser is unsafe and should not be run.

== See also ==
- Criticism of Qihoo 360
- 360 Safeguard
