= Qzone =

Social networking website

- Native name: QQ空间
- Website type: Social network service
- Available in: Chinese
- Owner: Tencent
- Website: qzone.qq.com
- Commercial: Yes
- Registration: required
- Launched: 2005; 21 years ago
- Current status: Active

Qzone
- Traditional Chinese: QQ空間
- Simplified Chinese: QQ空间
Transcriptions
Standard Mandarin
- Hanyu Pinyin: QQ Kōngjīan

Qzone (Chinese: QQ空间; pinyin: QQ Kōngjīan) is a Chinese social networking created by Tencent in 2005. It allows users to write blogs, keep diaries, send photos, listen to music, and watch videos. Users can customize Qzone background and select accessories based on their preferences.

== History ==
Qzone started in April 2005 as an interior service within the Tencent company. The name was originally "Little Home Zone" in Tencent company.

At the very beginning, the reference object of Qzone is not a social network, but blog products. "In 2005, Chinese blog market has been the rise of this market. Sina blog and MSN Space are two major competitors that we have. But Tencent did not have such power on media propagation, only relying on contents has no advantage. MSN spaces have a random combination of functional modules. The function of Space Decoration in Qzone was similar to it, and later on, we found the commercial value of it." Until now, the "Yellow Diamond System", Space Decoration still dominate. Qzone gradually transformed from a personal space, where users can customize blogs, keep diaries, post photos, watch videos and listen to music, to one of China's biggest social network.

=== Features of Qzone Album ===
==== Number of albums ====
Users can create up to 1,000 albums, each album can hold 10,000 photos.

==== Capacity of albums ====
Ordinary users have basic space size of 3GB for albums, and getting more space is possible. "Yellow Diamond" users and members can have 25GB-500GB space for album according to their level.

== Versions and key improvements ==
Version	Time	Key Improvements
Qzone 2.0	06/2005	Official release.
Qzone 4.0	06/2006	In July, Qzone blog (日志) released a new text editor that supports animation, audio and other multimedia content. In September, information center (信息中心) and the circle of friends (好友圈) were released. In November, dynamic album (动感影集) was released.
Qzone5.0	07/2008	Codenamed 'Freedom Summer' (自由之夏). Features include a wide mode, new themes and the ability to change layout by keypress
Qzone 6.0	05/2011	New version of Qzone is released.

== Censorship ==
Qzone is known to employ a variety of censorship methods, depending on the specific nature and level of sensitivity of the content being censored.

In strict cases, a user is prevented from posting at all. Upon clicking "publish," the tester is presented with an error message of some form, with varying degrees of explanation but usually implying that the content was sensitive in some way. Details are never given, providing an explanation as to what exactly the offending content was or why it was unpublishable. Industry sources have confirmed that posts censored in this way are blocked via an automated system triggered by keywords, phrases, or even whole passages that are plugged into the system by administrators.

QZone allows blocked posts to be published in "private view" (visible only to the author when logged in) but the post is not publicly visible. In its place appears a message: "This message is being previewed, which will take 3 working days. Once approved it will be possible to view normally." The post never appears if it is indeed blocked, however.

== Profits ==
The revenue and profit of Qzone mainly comes from its VIP service - "Canary Yellow Diamond". It's a monthly payment, and users with it can fully take advantage of basic services. In addition to advertising, the site makes money off selling virtual items, using a coin system called "Q" coins. Q coins are purchased by real money. There are many add-on services in social games such as QQ farm. In order to get higher rank in QQ farm, Yellow Diamond users can earn advanced equipment for the game without extra fee. It's estimated that there are 653 million monthly active users in the third quarter of 2015.

== See also ==
- Tencent QQ
