= Haitao Zheng =

Chinese-American computer scientist and engineer

Haitao "Heather" Zheng (Chinese: 郑海涛) is a Chinese-American computer scientist and electrical engineer. She is the Neubauer Professor of Computer Science at the University of Chicago. She was elected a Fellow of the Institute of Electrical and Electronics Engineers (IEEE) in 2015 for "contributions to dynamic spectrum access and cognitive radio networks". She was named to the 2022 class of ACM Fellows, "for contributions to wireless networking and mobile computing".

Zheng graduated in 1995 from the Special Class for the Gifted Young of Xi'an Jiaotong University in China, with a B.S. in electrical engineering. In 1999, she earned her Ph.D. in electrical and computer engineering from the University of Maryland, College Park, under the supervision of K. J. Ray Liu. After working at the Bell Labs and Microsoft Research Asia, she joined the faculty of the University of California, Santa Barbara (UCSB) in 2005. In 2017, she was appointed the Neubauer Professor of Computer Science at the University of Chicago. She remains an adjunct professor at UCSB.
