= 360 Total Security =

Antivirus developed by Qihoo 360

- Developer: Qihoo 360
- Initial release: 25 February 2014; 12 years ago
- Operating system: Windows XP or later macOS 10.7 or later
- Available in: 15 languages
- List of languages Arabic, Chinese (Traditional and Simplified), English, German, Hindi, Japanese, Portuguese, Spanish, Russian, Turkish, Vietnamese, French, Italian, Polish
- Type: Antivirus
- License: Freemium
- Website: www.360totalsecurity.com/en/

360 Safeguard
- Other names: 360安全卫士
- Developer: Qihoo 360
- Initial release: 17 July 2008; 17 years ago
- Operating system: Windows XP or later
- Available in: Simplified Chinese
- Type: Antivirus
- License: Freeware
- Website: weishi.360.cn

360 Total Security, or its Chinese version, 360 Safeguard (Chinese: 360安全卫士), is an antivirus software developed by Beijing, China-based internet security company Qihoo 360. 360 Safeguard's focus is on stopping malware such as computer viruses and trojan horses and providing security patches for Microsoft Windows.

360 Safeguard uses the proprietary 360 Cloud Scan, QVMII AI, QEX and Kunpeng engines, while 360 Total Security offers the option of using Avira and Bitdefender engines in addition to the proprietary scanning tools.

== Dispute with Tencent ==
In 2010, 360 Safeguard analyzed the QQ protocol and accused QQ of automatically scanning users' computers and uploading their personal information to QQ's servers without users' consent. In response, Tencent called 360 itself malware and denied users with 360 installed access to some QQ services. The Chinese Ministry of Industry and Information reprimanded both companies for "improper competition" and ordered them to come to an accord.

== Dispute with testing bodies ==
On 30 April 2015, the three independent security testing bodies AV-Comparatives, AV-TEST and Virus Bulletin published a joint press release criticizing Qihoo 360 after they found that Qihoo 360 had submitted products for comparative which behaved significantly different from end user products. The products for comparative used an engine by Bitdefender, while the end user products use Qihoo 360's own QVM engine instead. The testing bodies claimed that the end user products would provide a considerably lower level of protection and a higher likelihood of false positives. As a consequence, the three testing bodies revoked all certifications and rankings from earlier that year.

Qihoo 360 denied cheating allegations claiming that the QVM engine developed by Qihoo 360 would be more effective in China.

== See also ==
- 360 Secure Browser
- Internet security
- Qihoo 360
