= Mei Hong (computer scientist) =

Chinese computer scientist (born1963)

- Born: May 1963 (age 62); Yuqing County, Guizhou, China
- Occupation: computer scientist

Mei Hong (Chinese: 梅宏, born May 1963) is a Chinese computer scientist, a professor at Peking University, the director of Key Laboratory of High Confidence Software Technologies of Ministry of Education (MOE) at Peking University. He serves as President of the China Computer Federation (2020-2024), formerly the Vice President of The Academy of Military Sciences, Beijing Institute of Technology, and Shanghai Jiao Tong University. He is an academician of the Chinese Academy of Sciences, a foreign member of the Academia Europaea, a fellow of The World Academy of Sciences, an IEEE Fellow, and an ACM Fellow.

== Biography ==
Mei Hong was born May 1963 in Yuqing County, Guizhou, China. He earned his bachelor's degree in 1984 and his master's in 1987, both from Nanjing University of Aeronautics and Astronautics. In 1992, he obtained his Ph.D. from Shanghai Jiao Tong University.

Mei joined Peking University in 1992, and served as Dean of the School of Electronics Engineering and Computer Science from 2006 to 2014. He then became Vice President of Shanghai Jiao Tong University (2013-2016), Beijing Institute of Technology (2016-2019), and The Academy of Military Sciences (2019-2023). In 2020, he became the President of the China Computer Federation (2020-2024).

Mei was elected an academician of the Chinese Academy of Sciences in 2011, a fellow of The World Academy of Sciences in 2013, and a foreign member of the Academia Europaea in 2018. He was elected a Fellow of the Institute of Electrical and Electronics Engineers (IEEE) in 2014 for his "contributions to software architecture and component-based software engineering". He was named to the 2022 class of ACM Fellows, "for contributions to software engineering research and translation, and establishing research standards in China".
