= QQ Browser =

Web browser

- QQ Browser on Windows 11
- Developer: Tencent
- Initial release: November 29, 2012; 13 years ago

Stable release(s) [±]
- Windows: 10.8.4554.400 / November 23, 2021; 4 years ago
- macOS: 4.5.123.400 / January 15, 2021; 5 years ago
- iOS: 12.1.3 / November 19, 2021; 4 years ago
- Android: 12.1.5.5044 / November 15, 2021; 4 years ago
- Written in: C++
- Engine: WebKit / Trident
- Operating system: Windows, macOS; Android, iOS
- Available in: Simplified Chinese
- Type: Web browser
- License: Proprietary software, Free software
- Website: browser.qq.com

QQ Browser is a web browser based on the Chromium engine developed by Mainland Chinese technology company Tencent. It utilizes two browser engines: WebKit and Trident. Previously, Tencent had developed Tencent Explorer (Tencent TE) and Tencent TT, two browsers based on the Trident engine, as well as QQ Browser versions 5 and 6, which integrated the WebKit engine.

== History ==
On November 20, 2000, Tencent released the first version of Tencent Explorer and bundled it with the OICQ 2000 Preview1 1115 (now Tencent QQ). This browser is one of the earliest internet browsers in mainland China, rendering pages using the Trident layout engine (known as the Internet Explorer webpage renderer).

The first version of Tencent TE includes the "Who is with me" feature, which allows OICQ users who are browsing the same web page to communicate online, but this feature raises users' concerns about personal data security. In order to eliminate user concerns, Tencent issued a statement on April 24, 2003, stating that browsing the webpage does not reveal personal data when using this feature; if users do not want to use this feature but also want to use the browser, you can choose "Invisible" mode.

In 2003, Tencent rewrote its source code on the basis of Tencent TE, and released the first version of the new browser on November 11, Tencent TT (Tencent Traveler). At this point, the software was officially stripped from Tencent QQ and became an independent software. Compared with Tencent TE, Tencent TT has added personalized functions such as software skin replacement. At the same time, it also provides auxiliary functions such as mouse gesture and smart screen ads. But the "Smart Shielded Ads" feature records the content that users browse online, and stores the records in the TTraveler2.dat file in the software installation directory.

Tencent rewrote the program again in 2008 and released version 4.0 on May 7. From this version, TT opens the web page and browses it in multiple threads to improve speed and performance, but still centered on the Trident layout engine. The final version of the 4.X series is the 4.8 (1000) version released on January 5, 2011.

=== Dual-core QQ Browser (2010) ===
On May 25, 2010, Tencent released QQ Browser 5.0 Preview1 version, QQ Browser began to use Webkit and Trident dual-core. (Note: Tencent official said that using the Webkit engine for rendering as "speed mode", using the Trident engine is "normal mode".)

QQ Browser was jointly promoted with Search Dog Browser and Maple Browser (ChromePlus) which were also rendered using the double typesetting engine.

=== QQ Browser 7.0 Preview (2012) ===
In October 2012, the preview version of QQ Browser 7.0 was released on the Tencent Experience Center website and was open for testing. The QQ Browser 7.0 preview version adopts the new version of the interface, and the brand is consistent with the mobile QQ Browser. Version 7.0 removes the WebKit engine and greatly simplifies functionality.

=== QQ Browser 8.0 (2014) ===
In November 2014, QQ Browser released the official version of 8.0. The new version redesigned the appearance of the browser and added a series of new features to improve the smoothness of the browser.

=== QQ Browser 9.0 (2015) ===
In June 2015, QQ Browser 9.0 was released. Based on the Chromium V43 engine, it achieved a 0.3 second cold boot and a 0.1 second hot boot. The web page reached "seconds open".

=== QQ Browser 9.3 (2016) ===
In January 2016, QQ Browser 9.3 was released, and the engine was upgraded to Chromium V47, which optimized the startup speed and web page opening speed.

=== QQ Browser 9.6 (2017) ===
On October 18, 2017, QQ Browser 9.6 was released and the engine was upgraded to Chromium V53.

=== QQ Browser 9.7 (2018) ===
Latest version of QQ Browser based on Chromium 53.

=== QQ Browser 11.x series (2020) ===
The 11.x series, released in 2020, introduced performance enhancements, improved synchronization features, and deeper integration with Tencent services.

=== QQ Browser 12.x series (2022) ===
Released in 2022, the 12.x series focused on productivity features and enhancements to browsing performance.

=== QQ Browser 13.x series (2023) ===
The 13.x series, released in 2023, introduced user interface updates and further performance optimizations.

=== QQ Browser 14.x series (2024) ===
In 2024, the 14.x series added support for modern web standards and improved security features.

=== QQ Browser 19.x series (2025) ===
The 19.x series, released in 2025, introduced AI-assisted features along with improvements in speed, privacy, and overall performance.

=== QQ Browser 20.x series (2026) ===
The 20.x series, introduced in 2026, with continued updates focusing on performance, integrated AI features, and user experience improvements.

== Security issues ==
- The Windows and Android versions both send personal data to Tencent's servers without any encryption or with encryption that can be easily decrypted.
- Arbitrary code execution is also possible during software updates.
- In 2016, researchers at Citizen Lab reported that both the Android and Windows versions of QQ Browser transmitted personal user data insecurely. While some issues were later patched, security vulnerabilities persisted, raising privacy concerns.

== aiww event ==
On May 30, 2011, some netizens found that Tencent appeared in the picture on the "Tencent Soft-{}-piece Center" QQ Browser introduction page. The name of "aiww" (Chinese artist Ai Weiwei) appeared. In 2011, the words "freedom of personal freedom" and "64" were used, and the words "released" in the introductory text of the browser were also bolded. After the event, the words became "Love" and "99".

== See also ==
- Sogou
