= Sabu Thomas =

Indian professor (born 1960)

Prof. Dr Sabu Thomas Scientist
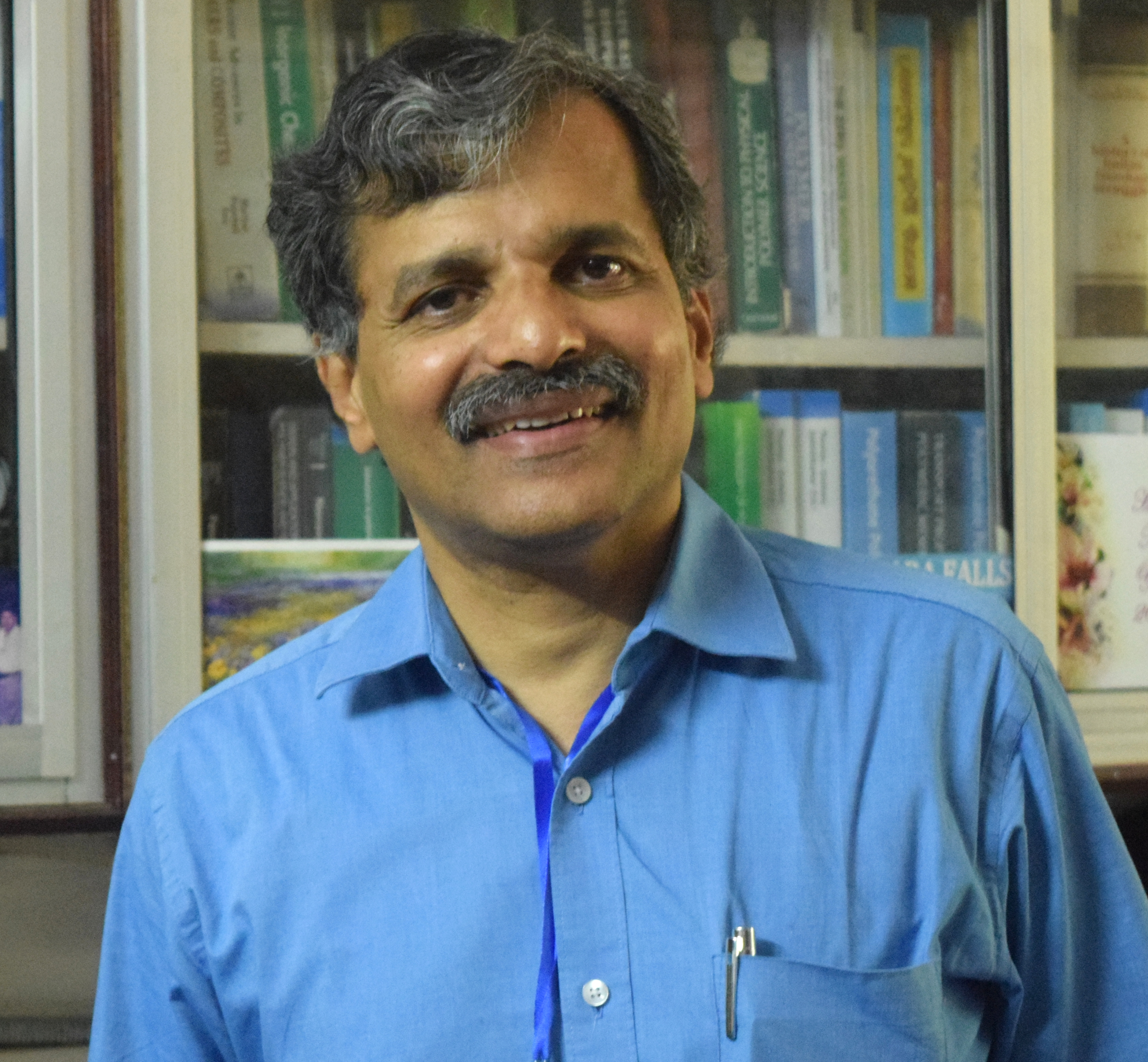
- Born: 14 March 1960 (age 66)
- Citizenship: Indian
- Known for: Director of International & Inter-University Centre for Nanoscience and Nanotechnology, School of Energy Materials & School of Nanoscience and Nanotechnology of Mahatma Gandhi University, India Former Vice Chancellor of Mahatma Gandhi University, India Former Director, Professor of School of Chemical Sciences, Mahatma Gandhi University, India Professor at University of Lorraine, Nancy, France Distinguished Visiting Professor, University of Johannesburg Senior Professor of Christ University, Bangalore, India Adjunct Professor at IIT Roorkee, India Fellow of the Royal Society of Chemistry, London Fulbright Fellow, USA

Academic background
- Education: Cochin University of Science and Technology; IIT Kharagpur
- Thesis: Polymer Blends
- Doctoral advisor: S. K. De, B R Gupta

Academic work
- Discipline: Scientist
- Institutions: Mahatma Gandhi University, Kottayam
- Website: http://www.sabuthomas.com

Sabu Thomas (born 14 March 1960) is an Indian professor who also served as the vice-chancellor of Mahatma Gandhi University, Kerala. He is also a full professor (25 March 1998 onwards) of Polymer Science and Engineering at the School of Chemical Sciences. He was the Pro-Vice Chancellor of Mahatma Gandhi University, Kerala during the period of 31 August 2017 to 31 August 2018, Director of School of Chemical Science during the period of 1 November 2010 to 31 December 2013. Hon. Director of International & Inter-University Centre for Nanoscience and Nanotechnology during the period of 28 March 2009 to 11 September 2015, 2 February 2016 to 11 October 2017.

== Early life ==
Sabu Thomas was born on 14 March 1962. He completed his schooling at Kumaranalloor Devi Vilasom HSS. He studied pre-degree at CMS College, Kottayam and then obtained BSc Degree in Chemistry from Kuriakose Elias College, Mannanam, Kottayam in 1980 and Bachelor of Technology Degree in Polymer Science and Rubber Technology from Cochin University of Science and Technology in 1983. He received his PhD from Indian Institute of Technology Kharagpur in 1987.

== Academic research ==
His areas of academic research include polymer nanocomposites and cellulose nanocomposites. He is the editor of the Elsevier journal Nano-Structures & Nano-Objects.

== Awards and recognition ==
In 2015, he received his first Docteur Honoris Causa from University of Southern Brittany in Lorient, France. In 2016, he received his second Doctorate honoris causa from University of Lorraine, France. He was awarded the Fellow of the Royal Society of Chemistry, London, FRSC in 2012. He received the Bronze Medal of the Chemical Research Society of India and the MRSI Medal of the Material Research Society of India in 2013. He was the recipient of Fulbright-Nehru International Education Administrators Award 2017. He received TRiLA Academician of the year 2018 award.

== Academic identity ==
1. Google Scholar : Prof. (Dr.) Sabu Thomas – Google Scholar Citations
2. Scopus : Scopus preview – Scopus – Author details (Thomas, Sabu)
3. ORCID : ORCID
4. ResearcherID : Prof. (Dr.) Sabu Thomas | Publons
5. Vidwan : Vidwan | Profile Page

== Books ==
Royal Society of Chemistry

1. Biobased Aerogels: Polysaccharide and Protein-based Materials,2018
2. Natural Polymers: Volume 1: Composites, 2012

Elsevier

1. Advances in Polymer Processing, 1st Edition, From Macro- To Nano- Scales, Woodhead Publishing, 2009

John Wiley & Sons

1. Advanced Materials for Electromagnetic Shielding, Fundamentals, Properties, and Applications,2018

CRC Press

1. Methodologies and Applications for Analytical and Physical Chemistry, 2018

Nova Publishers

1. Polymer Nanocomposite Research Advances, 2008
2. Progress in Polymer Nanocomposite Research, 2008
