= High School Affiliated to Xi'an Jiaotong University =

Public high school in Xi'an, Shaanxi, China

The High School Affiliated to Xi'an Jiaotong University 西安交通大学附属中学

Location
- 135 Xingqing N. Rd; 99 Yanxiang Rd; Xi'an, Shaanxi; China
- Coordinates: 34.223515°N 109.004679°E

Information
- Type: Public
- Motto: 弘德 广识 励志 笃行 (Virtues Knowledgeable Wisdom Execution)
- Established: 1959 (rebuilt in 1981)
- Principal: Wang Peidong
- Affiliations: Xi'an Jiaotong University
- Website: www.xajdfz.com.cn

The High School Affiliated to Xi'an Jiaotong University (西安交通大学附属中学; XAJDFZ) is a public high school in Xi'an, Shaanxi, China, affiliated with Xi'an Jiaotong University.

The origins of the school can be traced back to 1896 when it was established as the predecessor of Jiaotong University, namely Nanyang Public School and its Intermediate School. In 1909, the Intermediate School and the advanced preparatory courses were transformed into a middle school. In 1927, the original Nanyang University's affiliated junior high and elementary sections were reorganized into the private Nanyang Model Middle School.

In 1959, the Shaanxi Provincial Education Department decided to designate the original Xi'an City No. 44 Middle School, situated adjacent to Jiaotong University (Xi'an Branch), as an affiliated middle school to the university. In 1971, the school was brought under the jurisdiction of Xi'an City and was converted into a public school. In 1981, the High School Affiliated to Xi'an Jiaotong University was re-established.

== History ==
- In 1896, famous Qing Dynasty scholar, Sheng Huaixuan, established the Nanyang Public School in Shanghai. Then he invited American educator John Calvin Ferguson to serve as the vice-chancellor in the second year.
- In the spring of 1898, the Nanyang Public School established its own middle school, which was special due to its status and was managed by Wang Zhishan. He recruited new students from society.
- In 1909, the special middle school changed into common school which is also called "affiliated school". It was famous that time because its students are in high academic level.
- In 1920, Nanyang Public School changed into Shanghai Jiaotong University.
- In 1955, some university professors, teachers and students moved to Xi'an. Xi'an Jiaotong University was officially founded in 1959. The High School Affiliated to Xi'an Jiaotong University was established in July 1959.
- In July, 1959, The High School Affiliated to Xi'an Jiaotong University was established.
- In 1971, the high school was managed by Xi'an government and it changed name to "Xi'an No.38 Middle School".
- In 1981, in order to inherit history, HSXJTU was rebuilt.
- In 1991, HSXJTU was awarded the title of the key high school of Xi'an and Shaanxi province.
- In December, 2009, it was chosen as the first batch of demonstration high school in Shaanxi.

== Meaning of the school motto ==
弘德

From <Huayang Zhi>《华阳志》, Eastern Jin Dynasty. It means to promote civilization and virtue, and to advocate moral education and enlightenment. The school has always attached importance to ideological and moral education, adhering to the direction of running a school with moral education as the first priority, fostering the national spirit and cultivating a sound personality.

广识

From Liu Kai's <Wen shuo>《问说》, Qing Dynasty. It means that teachers and students study and learn, "learning" and "questioning" are complementary to each other, without "learning" can not raise questions, without "questioning" can not increase knowledge.

励志

Meaning that the ambition to focus on a certain area, in order to make a difference. As a teacher, we should strive to make progress in education and teaching; as a student, we should have a great ambition, lay a good foundation, and strive to excel in the pursuit of knowledge as a human being, and to be successful in learning and serving the country.

笃行

From the Confucian classic <Zhong yong>《中庸》. It has the meaning of cutting to the chase. At the level of moral practice, it emphasizes the need to be faithful and generous as a human being and to be consistent both internally and externally; and the need to be wholehearted, down-to-earth, and dedicated to work, so as to achieve the unity of knowledge and action.

== School Mission ==
努力追求适合每一个学生发展的教育。

To help each student to discover their talents.

培养有涵养、有责任心、有创新能力、有领袖素养、有国际胸怀的品学体兼优的可持续发展人才。

We aim at Nurturing whole persons with inner grace, responsibility, creativity, leadership and international outlook.
