= Kate Wang =

Chinese billionaire businesswoman

- Born: Wang Ying
- Education: Xi'an Jiaotong University (BS); Columbia Business School (MBA)
- Occupation: businesswoman
- Known for: co-founding RELX Technologies

Kate Wang (Chinese: 汪莹; pinyin: Wāng Yíng) is a Chinese billionaire businesswoman. She is the founder of a Chinese vaping company RLX Technology.

== Early life and career ==
She received a Bachelor of Science degree from the Xi'an Jiaotong University and Master of Business Administration from Columbia Business School.

Kate worked for Procter & Gamble's office in Guangzhou after graduating from college, before co-founding her own investment firm in Hong Kong. She also worked at Bain & Company between 2013 and 2014. She was the head of Uber China from 2013 to 2016, before moving to DiDi. She formed Relx Technology in 2018.

As of April 2021, her net worth was estimated at US$5 billion by Forbes.
