= Nationwide Master's Program Unified Admissions Examination =

Admissions examination for master's degree programs in China

The Nationwide Master's Program Unified Admissions Examination (全国硕士研究生统一招生考试) is an admissions examination for master's degree programs in China. The examination consists of a preliminary examination and a second-round examination organized by the national examination authorities and the universities.

The preliminary examination generally covers four subjects: English, mathematics, political science, and a subject test in the professional field of the master's program that candidates apply for. The first three subjects are national unified propositions. Depending on the professional fields, some subject tests are propositions by the universities where candidates apply for, and some subject tests are national unified propositions. Candidates will have the opportunity to take the second-round examination only after they meet the score standards in the initial examination.

The second-round examination consists of a written examination and an interview. It is a further examination of the candidate's professional level and practical ability based on passing the preliminary examination. The second-round examination determines whether the candidate can be selected for admission to the master's degree program.

In the recruitment of master's program students, due to restrictions in the admissions plan, some candidates cannot be arranged for the second-round examination or are not admitted after the second-round examination although they have reached the score line. For these candidates, the first-choice university will be responsible for transferring all their materials to their second-choice university in a timely manner.
