= Zhou Hongyi =

Chinese billionaire entrepreneur (born 1970)

- 周鸿祎
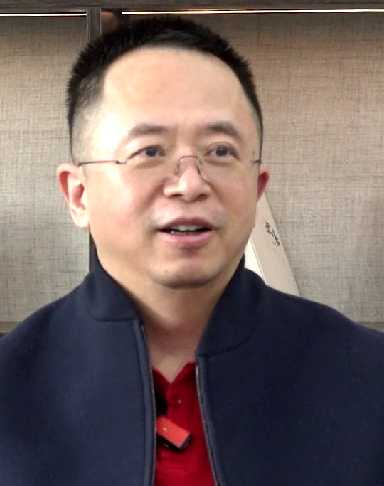
- Zhou Hongyi in 2025
- Born: 4 October 1970 (age 56); Huanggang, Hubei, China
- Education: Xi'an Jiaotong University
- Occupation: Businessman
- Known for: Co-founder, Chairman and CEO of Qihoo 360

Zhou Hongyi (Chinese: 周鸿祎; pinyin: Zhōu Hóngyī; born 4 October 1970) is a Chinese billionaire entrepreneur. He is the co-founder, chairman and CEO of the Internet security company Qihoo 360. As of November 2018, he is ranked #45 on Forbes China Rich List 2018 and #135 on Forbes Billionaires 2018, with an estimated net worth of $4.7 billion.

== Early life ==
Zhou Hongyi was born in Huanggang, Hubei, China. He has a master's degree from Xi'an Jiaotong University.

== Career ==
Zhou was one of China's pioneer internet entrepreneurs, founding 3721 in 1998, a search engine which sells Chinese-language keywords for Roman-alphabet domain names. 3721 was acquired by Yahoo! in 2004 for US$120 million with Zhou heading Yahoo! China's operation. However, with differences between Zhou and Yahoo's management, Yahoo eventually sold its China operations to Alibaba in 2005 and Zhou left to start Qihoo 360.

== Personal life ==
Zhou is divorced and lives in Beijing, China. In April 2023, Zhou reached an agreement with his former wife, Hu Huan, to transfer $1.3 billion worth of shares in Qihoo 360 Technology to her as part of their divorce settlement.
