= QQ Games =

Casual games client by Tencent

- Screenshot of QQ Games's homepage.
- Website type: Casual MMO, online games
- Available in: Chinese
- Owner: Tencent
- Website: qqgame.qq.com
- Registration: AIM Linked, Self Reg
- Launched: Late 2007
- Current status: Active

QQ Games (Chinese: QQ游戏) is a casual games client, offering only multi-player online games. Games are available through the QQ Games client and are entirely free to play. Partnering with AOL Instant Messenger through the AIM Plugin Gallery, AIM version 6.5 and up came bundled with the English version of QQ Games. While formerly linked to AIM in such a way that an AIM screename was required to play, the English QQ Games then offered its own account registration.

QQ Games is distinct in the US casual gaming sphere in the fact that it is one of the few services that offer a game hall experience, which combine community elements such as profiles, chat, and friends list, with exclusively multiplayer versions of the typical casual game contenders.

QQ Games is created by Tencent. Its English branch was created by Tencent America, LLC, a part of the Tencent group, headquartered in Redwood City, CA.

On April 21, 2017, Tencent announced the rebranding of its Chinese Tencent Game Platform (TGP) as WeGame, which will be going global in July 2017.

== History ==
The English version of QQ Games started its open Beta in Spring 2007 in partnership with AIM, and continued testing until October 3, 2007. Within the first week of its launch, the peak concurrent user number rose to over 500. Currently, the PCU hovers around 2500, which has increased as the number of games offered expanded. While the service only featured twelve multiplayer games at the time, and a Flash portal powered my MochiMedia if the site follows the model of QQ Games in China, the number of games offered is slated to expand as the service matures.

The QQ Games Support Team closed down English QQ Games on January 2, 2014 along with its website.

== See also ==
- Tencent Games
