= Tencent QQ =

Instant messaging software service

QQ
- Developer: Shenzhen Tencent Computer System Co., Ltd.
- Release: 10 February 1999; 27 years ago

Stable release(s) [±]
- iOS, iPadOS, watchOS: 9.2.12 / 28 August 2025; 14 months ago
- Android: 9.2.10 / 20 August 2025; 14 months ago
- Windows: 9.9.21 / 4 September 2025; 13 months ago
- Linux: 3.2.19 / 20 August 2025; 14 months ago
- macOS: 6.9.79 / 20 August 2025; 14 months ago
- HarmonyOS: 9.1.65 /
- Written in: C++; Java; JavaScript
- Engine: Electron
- Operating system: Cross-platform
- Available in: Simplified Chinese
- Type: Instant messaging
- License: Proprietary
- Website: im.qq.com

Tencent QQ (Chinese: 腾讯QQ), also known as QQ, is an instant messaging software service and web portal developed by the Chinese technology company Tencent. QQ offers services that provide online social games, music, shopping, microblogging, movies, and group and voice chat software. As of March 2023, there were 597 million monthly active QQ accounts.

== History ==
Tencent QQ was first released in China in February 1999 under the name of OICQ ("Open ICQ", a reference to the early IM service ICQ).

After the threat of a trademark infringement lawsuit by the AOL-owned ICQ, the product's name was changed to QQ (with "Q" and "QQ" used to imply "cute"). The software inherited existing functions from ICQ, and additional features such as software skins, people's images, and emoticons. QQ was first released as a "network paging" real-time communications service. Other features were later added, such as chatrooms, games, personal avatars (similar to "Meego" in MSN), online storage, and Internet dating services.

The official client runs on Microsoft Windows and a beta public version was launched for Mac OS X version 10.4.9 or newer. Formerly, two web versions, WebQQ (full version) and WebQQ Mini (Lite version), which made use of Ajax, were available. Development, support, and availability of WebQQ Mini, however, has since been discontinued. On 31 July 2008, Tencent released an official client for Linux, but this has not been made compatible with the Windows version and it is not capable of voice calls.

In response to competition with other instant messengers, such as Windows Live Messenger, Tencent released Tencent Messenger, which is aimed at businesses.

=== Membership ===
In 2002, Tencent stopped its free membership registration, requiring all new members to pay a fee. In 2003, however, this decision was reversed due to pressure from other instant messaging services such as Windows Live Messenger (WLM) and Sina UC. Tencent currently offers a premium membership scheme, where premium members enjoy features such as QQ mobile, ringtone downloads, and SMS sending/receiving. In addition, Tencent offers "Diamond" level memberships. Currently, there are seven diamond schemes available:

- Red for the QQ Show service which features some superficial abilities such as having a colored account name.
- Yellow to obtain extra storage and decorations in Qzone—a blog service.
- Blue to obtain special abilities in the game-plays of QQ games.
- Purple for obtaining special abilities in games including QQ Speed, QQ Nana, and QQ Tang
- Pink for having different boosts in the pet-raising game called QQ Pet.
- Green for using QQ music—a service for users to stream music online.
- VIP for having extra features in the chat client such as removing advertisements
- Black for gaining benefits related to DNF (Dungeon & Fighter), a multiplayer PC beat 'em up video game.

== QQ Coin ==
The QQ Coin is a virtual currency used by QQ users to "purchase" QQ related items for their avatar and blog. QQ Coins are obtained either by purchase (one coin for one RMB) or by using the mobile phone service. Due to the popularity of QQ among young people in China, QQ Coins are accepted by online vendors in exchange for "real" merchandise such as small gifts. This has raised concerns of replacing (and thus "inflating") real currency in these transactions.

The People's Bank of China, China's central bank, tried to crack down on QQ Coins due to people using QQ Coins in exchange for real world goods. However, this only caused the value of QQ coins to rise as more and more third-party vendors started to accept them. Tencent claims the QQ Coin is a mere regular commodity, and is, therefore, not a currency.

== Qzone ==
Qzone is a social networking website based in China which was created by Tencent in 2005. Qzone is a personal blog for QQ users. It can be set as a public page or a private friend-only page. Users can upload diaries and share photos.

== QQ International ==
=== Windows ===
In 2009, QQ began to expand its services internationally with its QQ International client for Windows distributed through a dedicated English-language portal.

QQ International offers non-Mandarin speakers the opportunity to use most of the features of its Chinese counterpart to get in touch with other QQ users via chat, VoIP, and video calls, and it provides a non-Mandarin interface to access Qzone, Tencent's social network. The client supports English, French, Spanish, German, Korean, Japanese and Traditional Chinese.

One of the main features of QQ International is the optional and automatic machine translation in all chats.

=== Android ===
An Android version of QQ International was released in September of 2013. The client's interface is in English, French, Spanish, German, Korean, Japanese and Traditional Chinese. In addition to text messaging, users can send each other images, videos, and audio media messages. Moreover, users can share multimedia content with all contacts through the client's Qzone interface.

The live translation feature is available for all incoming messages and supports up to 18 languages.

=== iOS ===
QQ International for iPhone and iOS devices was released at the end of 2013, fully equivalent to its Android counterpart.

=== Partnerships ===
In India, Tencent has partnered with ibibo to bring services such as chat, mail and game to the developing Indian internet sphere.

In Vietnam, Tencent has struck a deal with VinaGame to bring the QQ Casual Gaming portal as well as the QQ Messenger as an addition to the already thriving Vietnamese gaming communities.

In the United States, Tencent has partnered with AOL to bring QQ Games as a contender in the US social gaming market. Launched in 2007, QQ Games came bundled with the AIM installer, and competed with AOL's own games.com to provide a gaming experience for the AIM user base.

== Web QQ ==
Tencent launched its web-based QQ formally on 15 September 2009, the latest version of which being 3.0. Rather than solely a web-based IM, WebQQ 3.0 functions more like its own operating system, with a desktop in which web applications can be added.

=== Social network website ===
In 2009, Tencent launched Xiaoyou (校友, 'schoolmate'), its first social network website. In mid-2010, Tencent changed direction and replaced Xiaoyou with Pengyou (朋友, 'friends'), trying to establish a more widespread network, to which extant QQ users could be easily redirected, hence giving Pengyou a major advantage over its competitors. Tencent's social network Qzone is linked to in the International and native versions of QQ.

== Open source and cross-platform clients ==
Using reverse engineering, open source communities have come to understand the QQ protocol better and have attempted to implement client core libraries compatible with more user-friendly clients, free of advertisements. Most of these clients are cross-platform, so they are usable on operating systems which the official client does not support. However, these implementations had only a subset of functions of the official client and therefore were limited in features. Furthermore, QQ's parent company, Tencent, has over successive versions modified the QQ protocol to the extent that it can no longer be supported by most, and perhaps any, of the third-party implementations that were successful in the past (some of which are listed below). As of 2009, none of the developers of third-party clients have publicized any plans to restore QQ support.

- Pidgin, also known as: GAIM an open source cross-platform multiprotocol client, with third-party plugin.
- Adium, an open source macOS client, with third-party plugin built on top of libqq-pidgin
- Kopete, an open source multiprotocol client by KDE
  - Note: Kopete, old versions of Pidgin, and any other client whose QQ support was based on libpurple no longer supports QQ as of May 2011
- Miranda NG, an open source multiprotocol client, designed for Microsoft Windows, with MirandaQQ2 plugin.
- Eva
- Trillian, is a Multiprotocol Instant Messaging Software made as Freeware Developed by Cerulean Studios which ran off Plugins to connect to things such as: AIM, ICQ, Yahoo Messenger, MSN Messenger and XMPP/Jabber.

== Merchandise ==
Tencent has taken advantage of the popularity of the QQ brand and has set up many Q-Gen stores selling QQ branded merchandise such as bags, watches, clothing as well as toy penguins.

== Related characteristics ==
- The accounts of QQ are purely a combination of numbers. The account numbers provided for the registered users are selected randomly by the system user registration. In 1995, the registered QQ accounts had only 5 digits, while currently, the digital numbers used for QQ accounts has reached 12. The first QQ number is held by Ma Huateng and his account number is 10001.
- Membership to a QQ account usually lasts one month. When this membership is overdue and not renewed, the membership of the account will be suspended.
- In relation to calculating "QQ Age", being logged in for 2 full hours would be considered as one full day. Thus, being logged in to QQ for around 700 hours would make the age increase by 1 year. In the 2012 version of QQ, users can see the age on the personal information page.
- In 2004, Tencent launched QQ hierarchy which shows the level of a registered member. At the very beginning, this hierarchy was solely based on the hours a member spent in QQ. Hence, the longer the member stayed, the higher level they can attain. These results, however, were criticized as people tend to waste electrical energy due to longer hours of stay on the site. Therefore, Tencent changed the basis from an hour unit to a daily unit due to the involvement of several departments.

== Controversies and criticisms ==
=== Coral QQ ===
Coral QQ, a modification of Tencent QQ, is another add-on for the software, providing free access to some of the services and blocking Tencent's advertisements. In 2006, Tencent filed a copyright lawsuit against Chen Shoufu (aka Soft), the author of Coral QQ, after his distribution of a modified Tencent QQ was ruled illegal. Chen then published his modification as a separate add-on. On 16 August 2007, Chen was detained again for allegedly making profits off of his ad-blocking add-on. The case resulted in a three-year prison sentence for Shoufu.

=== Dispute with Qihoo 360 ===
In 2010, Chinese anti-virus company, Qihoo 360, analyzed the QQ protocol and accused QQ of automatically scanning users' computers and uploading their personal information to QQ's servers without the users' consent. In response, Tencent called 360 a malware and denied users of installing 360 access to some of the QQ's services. The Chinese Ministry of Industry and Information reprimanded both companies for "improper competition" and ordered them to come to an agreement.

=== Government surveillance ===
Some observers have criticized QQ's compliance in the Chinese government's Internet surveillance and censorship. A 2013 report by Reporters Without Borders specifically mentioned QQ as allowing authorities to monitor online conversations for keywords or phrases and track participants by their user number.

=== Adware controversy ===
The Chinese version of QQ makes use of embedded advertisements. Older versions of the client have been branded as malicious adware by some antivirus and anti-spyware vendors.

Both the Chinese and International versions of QQ had been tested in 2013. Currently it is identified as malware by DrWeb, Zillya, NANO-Antivirus, and VBA32, who give positive results, most of which identify it as a trojan.

== Security ==
On March 6, 2015, QQ scored 2 out of 7 points on the Electronic Frontier Foundation's secure messaging scorecard. It received points for having communications encrypted in transit and for having a recent independent security audit. It lost points because communications are not end-to-end encrypted, users can not verify contacts' identities, past messages are not secure if the encryption keys are stolen (i.e. the service does not provide forward secrecy), the code is not open to independent review (i.e. the code is not open-source), and the security design is not properly documented.

== See also ==
- Comparison of instant messaging clients
- WeChat
