= Copy to China =

Chinese company copying a western business

Copy to China (C2C or C to C) refers to when a company in China copies the business model of a successful foreign company, especially web and other IT companies. Such companies have often been very successful, out-competing the foreign company on the Chinese market. The degree of copying varies, from simply offering a directly competing service to closely mimicking the look and feel and name as pronounced in Chinese. It is a common topic of discussion how the Chinese IT industry can move beyond simple copying and localization into more innovation.

== List of C2C companies ==
These companies are famous examples of the Copy to China model. Many of them have evolved to more than a simple clone.

Chinese company	Similar to	Notes
Renren, Kaixin001	Facebook	
Youku, Tudou	YouTube	
Baidu Baike, Hudong	Wikipedia	Wikipedia is non-profit, but Baidu Baike and Hudong are commercial, and there is a dispute over copyrights between Baidu Baike and Wikipedia.
Baidu Space	MySpace	
Fanfou, Sina Weibo, Tencent Weibo	Twitter	
Diandian	Tumblr	
Zhihu	Quora	
Acfun, Bilibili	Niconico	
Jianshu, 15yan	Medium	"Pixel level copy". Its creator is also a popular science site in China.
SegmentFault	StackOverflow	
Meituan	Groupon, Yelp, TripAdvisor	
WeChat	Kakao Talk	

== See also ==
- Shanzhai
- Software industry in China
- Internet in the People's Republic of China
