= Weibo (disambiguation) =

Weibo, previously known as Sina Weibo, is a Chinese microblogging website.

Weibo may also refer to:

== 微博 ==
- Microblogging in China, or China-based microblogging services (微博), including:
  - NetEase Weibo (网易微博), launched by NetEase
  - People's Weibo (人民微博), launched by People's Daily
  - Phoenix Weibo (凤凰微博), launched by Phoenix Television
  - Weibo Corporation, which owns Sina Weibo
  - Sohu Weibo (搜狐微博), launched by Sohu
  - Tencent Weibo (腾讯微博), launched by Tencent Holdings
  - (more indexed on Microblogging in China#List)

== Other uses ==
- Weibo, Hebei (位伯), a town in Shijiazhuang, Hebei, China
- Weibo (Tang dynasty) (魏博), a circuit in Chinese Tang Dynasty, northeast to the recent Daming County, Hebei, China
- Will Pan (潘瑋柏; Pan Weibo; born 1980), Taiwanese-American singer
