= Search engine marketing in China =

As of 2010, the largest internet enterprises in China were Baidu, Tencent, and Alibaba followed by Soso, Sogou, Bing, and Yahoo. In March 2010, Google which had been in the list from 2000, was forced to pull out from China because of a heated dispute with the Chinese Government regarding the censoring of search engine results.

China also has banned Twitter, YouTube and Facebook. There are local Chinese versions available in the form of Sina Weibo and Youku.

The Great China Firewall's presence obviates international businesses from gaining a foothold in China's online market. This gives local businesses the opportunity to compete against each other. It also allows them to create their own platforms that can rival their western counterparts. An example of this is Baidu, China's search engine comparable to Google. Baidu controls 76% percent of China's market share.

== Assembling data ==
While looking at marketing performance for a search engine, finding data and metrics are crucial for their business model. Within this data, companies and organizations can gather details in understanding and adjusting the efficiency and effectiveness in marketing. This course of action will drive businesses to a better ROI and decisions.

According to The Marketing Score Blog, several factors rely in evaluating the website's traffic. A traditional metric showing the organization's marketing effort. Below are a few examples of what to look for in measuring the retrieved data.

- Social Media: What means of attracting more visitors to your brand? Facebook? Twitter? Customer service? Are two-way conversations being made through the said mediums? What drives the customers to your product, and does the media reach out to the appropriate audience?
- Website Traffic and subscribers: Much of the effort comes from having a keen awareness in managing via TOFU (top of the funnel), alongside, polish/reinforce your brand. All are possible by expanding through the different mediums to gather more visitors. And as the visitors grow, does the company maintain a constant activity through updates?
- Customer Retention Rates (CRR): Some managers may not pay much attention to long term customers as a measurement. In fact, marketing should keep a keen sight and ideas to remain a hold on such customers. Different company departments should discuss and form new plans, for customers could act as a representative for their product.

An additional example, provided by the CMI (Content Marketing Institute), they utilize the KPI (Key Performance Indicator).

- Analyzing the medias: Keep track of the growth in social medias and web traffics, which in turn, helps pinpoint the growing trend and assemble customer's comments. These two factors help in creating updates that will help spread the brand, however, it is more important to keep records of dialogues with the customers. This will greatly help in strategize a plan that meets their interest.
- Follow up actions: Stay with information that you can pursue into an action. As one example, the CMI has created a document which tracks social medias on a regular basis. After careful observations of these KPIs, the team has changed its directions to variables that they can take action on; The interactions with subscribers, varying exchange rate in emails, and invitations/sign ups for events.
- Collection and Analysis: Through several automated systems, including CMI's very own, the team can take a look at all the data recorded into the dashboards. Afterwards, the data must be read to get a grasp on the next marketing opportunity and adjustments.

== China's media environment ==
While having their own popular social media platforms, their contents differ compared to the western counterparts. Sina Weibo, China's Twitter, centers around retweeting the same topic over and over. Though it lacks in variety, the post itself will gain a large visibility among users. Whereas, Twitter focuses on current events that circulate for a short time.

As stated in the start, China greatly emphasizes in local entrepreneurship. Due to the competitive nature, it is not surprising to see a company attack its rival with criticisms. It is often advised to monitor the sources carefully when comparing reviews of the competitor's, as well, your own. A misstep can be made when coming with a conclusion based on faulty information gathered without careful examination.

Because of the different environment, it is best to adapt to the new domain, and reconfigure your strategy. Competition between locals is the norm: Various platforms Youku and Tudou, Sina Weibo and Weixin, Renren and Kaixin001 etc. are some of the largest companies comparing against each other in their field.
