= Wang Yan (entrepreneur) =

Chinese entrepreneur (born 1972)

- 汪延
- Born: May 25, 1972 (age 54); Beijing, China
- Education: Panthéon-Assas University, Affiliated High School of Peking University
- Occupation: Entrepreneur
- Known for: co-founding Sina.com, one of the earliest Internet startups in China.
- Title: Chairman of Sina Yangfan Charity Foundation
- Board member of: Sina Corp, Weibo

Wang Yan (Chinese: 汪延; born 1972) is a Chinese billionaire entrepreneur who co-founded the Chinese technology company Sina Corp. He formerly served as CEO and chairman of the company, and currently serves on the company's board of directors. He is widely regarded as one of the most successful and influential figures in the Chinese technology industry, and known to be extremely private and media-shy.

== Early life and education ==
Wang was born in Beijing, China, in 1972. His father, Wang Hua (汪华), was a diplomat, investment banker and businessman in France. His grandfather, Wang Dezhao, was a prominent physicist and academician of the Chinese Academy of Sciences. Wang graduated from Affiliated High School of Peking University in Beijing. He attended Panthéon-Assas University (formerly known as University of Paris II) in Paris where he later earned a B.A. in Law and a Master's in International Relations.

== Career ==
As a law student in Paris in 1996, Wang, along with two high school classmates, created a web portal called SRSNet. This became the prototype for Sina.com, which was put online in 1998 after a merger of SRSNet and SinaNet, a Chinese language web site in the US. As the General Manager of China Operations, Wang was involved in taking Sina public in April 2000, where it was the first ever Mainland Chinese Internet company to be listed on Nasdaq. He served as Sina's president in 2001, and as CEO in May 2003.

During Wang's tenure as CEO and President, Sina had become a dominant Internet portal with the largest online advertisement market share in China according to IResearch Consulting Group while pursuing aggressive mergers & acquisitions. In 2003, it emerged as the first profitable public-listing internet group in China by changing into a series of new business opportunities besides online advertising, such as mobile content service of which annual revenue significantly improved in 2004. Under Wang's leadership, Sina started to tap into social media amid fierce competition from rivals. In 2005, Sina Blog was launched which eventually paved the way for the birth of Sina Weibo, a Twitter-like micro-blogging platform that would later reach 431 million monthly active users in June 2018.

In 2005, Wang's refusal and resistance to the hostile takeover by Shanda attracted world-wide attention The takeover was considered as "the first hostile takeover by a leading China-based company of a local rival". After Wang's strong opposition to the deal and Sina's Board's issuance of "poison pill", Shanda backed off.

Wang stepped down from CEO in May 2006. Sina's rapid expansion left a number of failed attempts, especially in trying to develop online gaming, e-commerce, and search technologies. These were believed to have led to Wang's stepping down as the Chief Executive. In an interview, he admitted some of the mistakes he had made.

Afterwards, he stayed on the company's board where he has served in various positions including Acting Chairman and chairman., succeeded by Charles Chao in October 2012. He remains on the company's board of directors.

== Political and social ventures ==
Wang serves as a member of the Central Committee and the head of the IT industry commission of the China National Democratic Construction Association (CNDCA), one of China's eight non-communist democratic political parties. In 2006, the IT industry commission of CNDCA submitted the "Personal Information and Data Protection Bill", Wang animated its congressional debate in order to push for its enactment.

With the coverage of the nationwide network of CNDCA, Wang founded in 2007 the Yangfan Charity Program (became in 2012 Sina Yangfan Charity Foundation), a non-profit, charitable organization dedicated to provide educational resources for under-privileged children in rural areas of China. By 2016, the foundation has donated more than 2 million books.

In 2004, Wang was one of the 10 founding members of the Society Entrepreneur Ecology (SEE) Foundation, a non-governmental organization initiated by Chinese entrepreneurs committed to ecological environmental protection in China.

Wang has also served as an inaugural vice chairman of Internet Society of China in 2005 and a Strategic Committee member of the France China Foundation in 2012

Wang became an Asia Fellow of Harvard Kennedy School's Ash Center for Democratic Governance and Innovation in 2012.
