= 56.com =

Chinese video sharing website

- Screenshot Screenshot of 56.com home page
- Company type: Private
- Website type: Video sharing
- Available in: Simplified Chinese
- Founded: October 2005
- Headquarters: Guangzhou, Guangdong, {{{location_country}}}
- Founders: Zhou Juan (周娟); Liang Sheng (梁升); Tan Yi (谭毅)
- Industry: Web 2.0
- Services: Social network service, Online movie and book database
- Parent: Sohu
- Website: www.56.com
- Registration: Optional (required to upload)
- Current status: Active

56.com (Chinese: 我乐网 or 56网) is one of the largest video sharing websites in China where users can upload, view, and share video clips.

A fully owned subsidiary of Sohu, the company is headquartered in Tianhe District, Guangzhou, Guangdong.

The domain 56.com attracted at least 3.2 million visitors annually by 2008 according to a Compete.com survey.

At 6PM on June 3, 2008, the site access was suspended. 56.com provided an explanation at 10:00 on June 4, 16 hours after the website's access was blocked, stating that the website had experienced a server failure and was being repaired, but did not provide a clear time for when services would be fully restored. Some media, such as Hexun.com and Sina.com, reported that as 56.com had violated relevant government rules with its video content too frequently, and therefore been issued a warning by the government and might be closed for a few days. However, this was denied by 56.com. By July 11, 2008, access to 56.com was restored.

On December 31, 2014, Sohu had reached a deal with compatriot social networking site operator Renren to acquire 56.com. According to a source familiar with the deal, Sohu paid US$25 million for 56.com.

== See also ==
- QQ Video
- Baidu Space
- Tudou
- Youku
- Internet in China
