= Microblogging in China =

Mini-blogging service used in China

Weibo
- Chinese: 微博
- Literal meaning: Microblog(ging)
Transcriptions
Standard Mandarin
- Hanyu Pinyin: Wēibó
- Bopomofo: ㄨㄟ˙ㄅㄛ˙
- Wade–Giles: Wei-Po
- Tongyong Pinyin: Wēibó
- IPA: [wéɪ pwǒ]
Yue: Cantonese
- Yale Romanization: Mèih Bok
- Jyutping: Mei^{4} Bok^{3}
- IPA: [mej˩ pɔk̚˧]

Full name
- Chinese: 微博客 or 微型博客
Transcriptions
Standard Mandarin
- Hanyu Pinyin: Wēi bókè or Wēixíng bókè
- IPA: [wéɪ pwǒ kʰɤ̂] or [wéɪ ɕǐŋ pwǒ kʰɤ̂]
Yue: Cantonese
- IPA: [mej˩ pɔk̚˧.hak̚˧] or [mej˩ jɪŋ˩.pɔk̚˧.hak̚˧]

Weibo (Chinese: 微博; pinyin: wēi bó) is a general term for microblogging, but normally understood as Chinese-based mini-blogging services, including social chat sites and platform sharing.

Weibo services make it possible for internet users to set up real-time information sharing communities individually, and upload and update information. Weibo services use a format similar to the American-based Twitter-service, but are used almost exclusively by Chinese language speakers. The format of specific features is not exactly identical, such as, for example, hashtags on Sina Weibo and Tencent Weibo, which both employ a double-hashtag "#HashName#" method, since the lack of spacing between Chinese characters necessitates a closing tag. A major difference – also in this digital arena – is that characters in idiom-based scripts, such as Chinese and Japanese can use fewer characters to convey information, as, for example witnessed by the 280 (formerly 140) characters limit that is in use on Twitter. In 2016 the 140 character block limit was lifted by Sina Weibo. Sina Weibo is the most visited such site in China. Sina has used the domain name weibo.com for the service since April 2011. Because of the site's popularity and domain name, the term Weibo is often used generically to refer to Sina Weibo or Tencent Weibo.

Weibos are a major source of commentary on a wide range of topics. After the high-speed Wenzhou train collision in 2011 in which 40 people died, online posting played a key role in spreading the news quickly and discussing and evaluating government response.

In 2012, there were 309 million people microblogging in China.

== Term ==
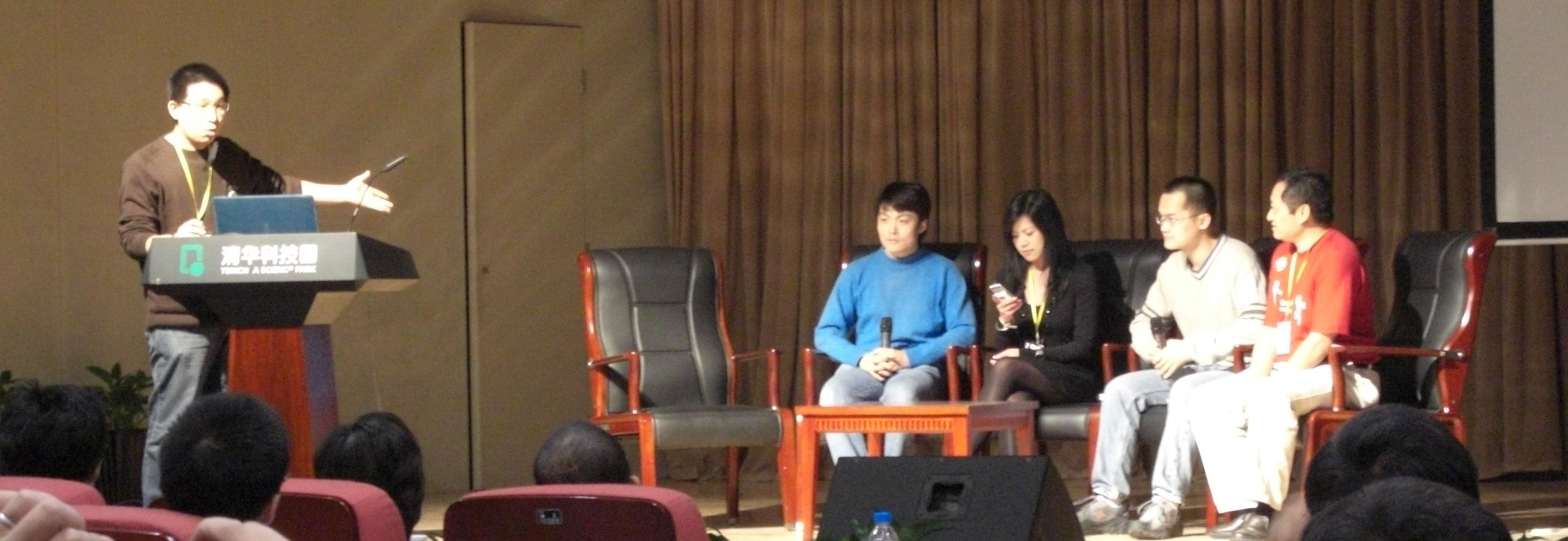
Microblogging panel, Chinese Blogger conference 2007

Wei boke (微博客) and weixing boke (微型博客), commonly abbreviated as weibo (微博), are Chinese words for "microblog". A China-based microblogging service often names itself a weibo by putting it after the name of the service (e.g. Tencent Weibo, Sina Weibo). A similar word "围脖" (pinyin: Wéibó; lit. 'scarf around the neck') is used as Internet slang for "weibo".

== History ==
Fanfou is the earliest notable weibo service. It was launched in Beijing on May 12, 2007 by the co-founder of Xiaonei (now Renren) Wang Xing. The website's layout, API, and mode of use was highly similar to Twitter, which was created earlier in 2006. Fanfou's users increased from 0.3 million to 1 million in the first half of 2009. The users included HP China, the Southern Weekly, artist Ai Weiwei, writer Lian Yue (连岳) and TV commentator Liang Wendao (梁文道).

Some other weibo services, such as Jiwai, Digu, Zuosa and Tencent's Taotao were launched in 2006-2009.

After the July 2009 Ürümqi riots, the CPC government shut down most of the domestic weibo services, including Fanfou and Jiwai. Many popular non China-based microblogging services such as Twitter, Facebook and Plurk have been blocked since then. Sina.com's CEO Charles Chao considered it to be an opportunity.

Sina launched Sina Weibo on August 14, 2009. Its executives invited and persuaded many Chinese celebrities to join the service, which led to strong growth in user numbers.

Two other Chinese Internet portals, Sohu and NetEase, launched the beta versions of their weibo sites almost simultaneously, on January 20, 2010. On January 30, another Internet portal Tencent closed its weibo service, Taotao, and started its new weibo service Tencent Weibo on March 5, 2010. Building on the large number of its instant messaging service QQ's users, Tencent Weibo later attracted more registered users than Sohu Weibo and NetEase Weibo. The public beta versions of NetEase Weibo and Sohu Weibo were launched on March 20 and April 7, 2010, respectively.

All these weibos, provided by the Chinese Internet giants, used the subdomain "t.example.com", such as t.sina.com.cn for Sina Weibo, t.qq.com for Tencent Weibo, t.sohu.com for Sohu Weibo, t.163.com for NetEase Weibo. On 7 April 2011, the leader of the weibo services Sina Weibo started to use an independent domain name weibo.com acquired earlier, in an attempt to build up its own brand.

Sohu Weibo and NetEase Weibo were suspended between July 9–12 and July 13–15, 2010, respectively. Since then, all of the Chinese weibo services have attached a note of "beta version" to their title logos. Commentators said that Sohu Weibo and NetEase Weibo were being "reorganized" by Chinese administrators. The weibo services were not officially approved, so they could only be operated as a "beta version".

Some closed weibos were re-opened under restrictions in 2009 or 2010, including Fanfou, which was re-launched in November 2010. Most of Fanfou's users never came back.

== Users ==
Before July 2009, Fanfou was the most influential weibo website. In February 2011, Tencent announced that its weibo registrations had exceeded 100 million. This threshold was officially passed by Sina Weibo in March 2011. However, according to iResearch's report on March 30, 2011, Sina Weibo took a commanding lead over its competitors, with 56.5% of China's microblogging market based on active users, and 86.6% based on browsing time.

According to the China Internet Network Information Center, in the first half of 2011, Chinese weibo users increased from 63.11 million to 195 million. By July 2011, 40.2% Chinese Internet users and 34.0% Chinese mobile Internet users used weibo/microblogs. In Dec 2010, it had been, respectively, 13.8% and 15.5%. (Note: The statistical data may or may not include the mainland Chinese users that bypass the Great Firewall to use blocked microblogging services outside China.)

Quite a number of studies revealed that the active microblog users are government departments in China. For example, the top 5 Weibo microbloggers on the topic construction safety were government departments. The People's Liberation Army makes extensive use of weibo for psychological warfare, public opinion warfare, and United Front activities related to Taiwan.

== Censorship and free speech ==
In July 2009, Chinese microblogs were severely curtailed when most of the domestic weibo services such as Fanfou were shut down. But it brought the birth of others, such as Tencent Weibo and Sina Weibo, operated by large Chinese Internet companies. Sohu Weibo and NetEase Weibo were suspended in July 2010 under the order of the Chinese administrators. Weibo is now operated as a "beta version", enabling the user to circumvent prohibition.

Due to the Internet censorship in China, all of the China-based weibo services are now controlled by various self-censorship policies and methods. They usually have an automatically checked list of blacklisted keywords. Sometimes administrators monitor these manually. Posts on topics which are sensitive and forbidden in China (e.g. Human Rights, Liu Xiaobo) are deleted, and the user's account may be blocked.

From 29 July 2020, Cyberspace Administration will carry out a three-month special censorship action to We-Media in China. One topic of the action is distributing We-Media accounts, which are on 13 major platforms including WeChat and Weibo, into different classes and categories. The action aims to stop We-Media's spreading false information, incorrectly discussing the history of CPC and China, promoting wrong perspective of values, malicious marketing and extortion.

Some scandals and controversies such as the Li Gang incident, were uncovered by weibo. After incidents such as the Wenzhou train collision and the 2010 Shanghai fire, criticism of the CPC government increased on weibo.

Although weibo services have not always met the approval of the government, many Chinese officials have opened weibo accounts. The official newspaper of the Central Committee of the Chinese Communist Party, the People's Daily, also launched its own People's Weibo (人民微博) in February 2010, with some governmental organizations and officials blogging on it.

Recent studies have shown that official microblogging has become a sophisticated e-government effort for social management, especially for local governments and state units. It has led to a gradual change in local government's social governance strategy and functional change from being a service provider to a 'service predictor'. The latter requires enhanced capabilities to deliver individualized services and institute state surveillance via commercial service providers. In doing so, government units are experimenting with ways of interaction and negotiation with the microblogging public and service providers in their attempt to improve social management and political legitimacy. This negotiation process also exposes and/or creates inter-governmental tensions, since local governments in China consist of distinct units with their own particular preferences and operation procedures.

The 2016 decision in the South China Sea arbitration resulted in a large-scale outpouring of criticism from Chinese internet users. From 1 July to 20 July 2016, over five million microblogs directly addressed the decision. It was one of the most discussed topics online in China during this period.

=== The "Real Name" policy ===
Since 2011, there have been rumors that the government will institute a "Real Name" policy for Weibo users. Early in February 2012, China's four key weibo companies – Sina, Sohu, NetEase and Tencent – announced that March 16, 2012, was the deadline for users to adopt their real name identity.

The "Real Name" policy requires all users on Chinese weibos to register with the name on their government issued ID card. However, the username that shows on their homepage doesn't have to be their real legal name. The Real Name Policy would assist the government in controlling speech and communication on the Internet, and would facilitate Internet censorship.

Although the regulation was supposed to take effect on March 16, 2012, the policy was not implemented. Many weibo users complained about this policy, and Sina Weibo started to censor posts that contain the phrase "real name registration" or any related terms on its services from March 19, 2012.

A "Big V" is a microblogger with a substantial following and a verified account such as Kong Qingdong.

== Relevant policies ==
(directly translated from the official regulation)

Several Regulations on Microblog Development and Administration Enacted by the Beijing Government

1. For standardizing the microblog service and its development and management, maintaining the order of online communication, ensuring information securities, protecting the legitimate interest of the Internet information services sites and the microblog users, satisfying the public's needs to Internet information, and promoting well-ordered development of the Internet, this regulation referred to the actual situation of the city and is enacted according to the "Telecommunications Regulations of the People's Republic of China", the "Measures for the Administration of Internet Information Services" and other laws, legislations, and regulations.

2. All website firms developing microblog services within the city's administrative area and all their microblog users ought to comply with this regulation.

3. The microblog development and management adheres to the principles of positive utilization, practical development, rightful administration, and security guarantee. It has positive impact on promoting microblog construction and use, as well as its service to the community.

4. The development of microblog services must comply with the constitution, laws, legislations, and regulations. It should propagate the socialist core value system and the advanced socialist culture, and serve to the establishment of a socialist harmonious society.

5. All rights reserved to the municipal government of Beijing to enact plans for microblog service and development, and to enact regulations on the total amount, structure and layout of the microblog service sites.

6. All microblog service sites within the city's administration area must rightfully ask for permission from the department that is in charge of Internet information content before applying for a telecommunications business license or performing non-operational Internet information services filing procedures.

7. All microblog service sites must comply with relevant laws, legislations, regulations and the following rules:

- (1) Establishing and improving administrative regulations for microblog information security.
- (2) Determining the agency responsible for information security, and equipping with appropriate personnel with professional knowledge and skills according to the number of users and the amount of information on microblogging sites.
- (3) Implementing technical security control measures.
- (4) Establishing and improving the administrative regulations on user information security; protecting the user information security and strictly prohibiting disclosure of user information.
- (5) Establishing and improving the disclosure system of false; publicizing truthful information timely.
- (6) Must not provide information interface to websites without a telecommunications business license or that fails to record performing non-commercial Internet information service to relevant departments.
- (7) Must not create fake microblog user accounts.
- (8) Prohibiting and controlling users who spread harmful information; reporting to the public security bureau if found a violation of public security administration or a suspect of crime.
- (9) Assisting and cooperating with relevant departments to carry out administration and management.

8. All microblog service sites must establish and improve censorship regulations on information content, and regulate the creation, copy, publish and transmit of content on microblogging sites.

9. Any group or person who registers a microblog account and create, duplicate, publish or transmit information must use real identification information; must not use fake or others' residence identification information, business registration information or organization code information to register a microblog account. Microblog service sites must ensure the authenticity of registered users' information.

10. Any organization or person must not unlawfully use microblog to create, duplicate, publish or transmit information containing any content that:

- (1) violates the principles of the constitution;
- (2) endangers national security, leaks state secrets, subverts the national government and regime or undermines national unity;
- (3) harms national honor and national interest;
- (4) incites ethnic hatred, ethnic discrimination or undermines national unity;
- (5) undermines the state religion policies or propagates cult and feudalistic superstition;
- (6) spreads rumors, disturbs social order or undermines social stability;
- (7) spreads obscenity, pornography, gambling, violence and terror or abets the commission of crimes;
- (8) insults or slanders others, infringes others' lawful rights and interest,
- (9) incites unlawful assembly, association, procession, demonstration or gatherings that disturbs social order;
- (10) plans activities under the name of illegal civil organizations;
- (11) contains other content prohibited by laws and administrative regulations.

11.The news administrative department of the municipal people's government, the municipal public security bureau, the municipal department of telecommunication administration and the municipal department of Internet information content must work on microblog development and administration in accordance with their respective responsibilities.

12. The Association of Online Media, the Internet Industry Association, the Communication Industry Association and other industry organizations must establish and improve the self-regulation in the microblog industry, guide the establishment and improvement of microblog service regulations, and train and educate the websites' employees.

13. Any organization or persons may report acts that violate this regulation to the news administrative department of the municipal people's government, the municipal public security bureau, the municipal department of telecommunication administration and the municipal department of Internet information content. The department that receives the report must handle it in accordance to the law.

14. For microblog users and microblog service sites who violate this regulation, the news administrative department of the municipal people's government, the municipal public security bureau, the municipal department of telecommunication administration and the municipal department of Internet information content must handle it in accordance to the law.

15. Microblog service sites that opened before the publication of this regulation must, within three months from the date of publication of this regulation, apply for relevant formalities at the municipal department that is in charge of Internet information content, and regulates the existing microblog users.

16. This regulation shall come into force as of the date of publication.

== Alphabetical list of notable China-based microblogging/weibo services ==
- Baidu Talk (百度说吧), launched by Baidu, closed
- Digu (嘀咕)
- Fanfou (饭否), one of the earliest weibo services, highly similar to Twitter, closed due to Chinese censorship, re-opened in November 2010
- Follow5
- Hexun Weibo (和讯微博), launched by Hexun
- Jiwai (叽歪)
- NetEase Weibo (网易微博), launched by NetEase
- People's Weibo (人民微博), launched by People's Daily
- Phoenix Weibo (凤凰微博), launched by Phoenix Television
- Sina Weibo (新浪微博), launched by SINA Corporation, by far the most popular weibo in China, with over 300 million users (Official website)
- Sohu Weibo (搜狐微博), launched by Sohu
- Tencent Weibo (腾讯微博), launched by Tencent Holdings
- Tianya Weibo (天涯微博), launched by Tianya Club
- Xinhua Weibo (新华微博), launched by Xinhua News Agency
- Zuosa (做啥)
- CNTV Weibo (央视微博), launched by CNTV

== Chinese microbloggers on Twitter ==
Ai Wei-wei, a well-known Chinese artist and activist, who has been arrested and controlled by the Chinese government, is one of the most active Chinese microbloggers on Twitter.

Due to the strict Internet censorship policy on microblogging enacted by the CPC government, a number of Chinese microbloggers choose to make posts that contain "sensitive contents" on Twitter. Although Twitter has been blocked in China since 2009, most Twitter users who reside in China can access the Twitter website using a proxy. More information can be found on List of websites blocked in China.

Twitter users include Chinese nationals, who participated in, or led, the Chinese democracy movement that took place on June 4, 1989, such as Liu Xiaobo, the 2010 Nobel Peace Prize winner and a political prisoner in China.

Weibo's most significant competition is rival microblogging service, WeChat, as of 2014 the country's leading messaging application.

== See also ==
- Microblogging
- Comparison of microblogging services
- Internet in the People's Republic of China
- Internet censorship in the People's Republic of China
