= Charles Zhang =

Chinese businessman

- 张朝阳
- Born: October 31, 1964 (age 61); Xi'an, China
- Education: Tsinghua University (BS); Massachusetts Institute of Technology (PhD)
- Occupations: Founder, chairman & CEO Sohu
- Board member of: Changyou.Com Ltd

Chinese name
- Simplified Chinese: 张朝阳
- Traditional Chinese: 張朝陽
Transcriptions
Standard Mandarin
- Hanyu Pinyin: Zhāng Cháoyáng
- Bopomofo: ㄓㄤ ㄔㄠˊ ㄧㄤˊ
- Gwoyeu Romatzyh: Jang Chaoyang
- Wade–Giles: Chang^{1} Chʻao-yang^{2}
- Tongyong Pinyin: Jhāng Cháoyáng
Wu
- Suzhounese: Tsan^{1} Zau^{2}-yan^{2}
Yue: Cantonese
- Yale Romanization: Jēung Chìuh-yèuhng
- Jyutping: Zoeng1 Ciu4 joeng4
- Website: corp.sohu.com

Charles Zhang or Zhang Chaoyang (Chinese: 张朝阳; pinyin: Zhāng Cháoyáng) (born October 31, 1964) is a Chinese businessman and founder of Sohu Inc (Chinese: 搜狐), which was listed on NASDAQ in 2000. Zhang was ranked 37th on Forbes China’s 100 Richest list in 2000 and 20th in 2003.

== Early life and education ==
Zhang was born in Xi'an, China. His parents were residential physicians at a small arsenal near Xi'an. His ancestors were from Henan. Zhang had been interested in science from a very young age. He studied at the Xi'an Qinghua middle school (西安庆华中学) and transferred to the Xi'an Middle School of Shaanxi Province.

Zhang was admitted to study physics at Tsinghua University in Beijing and graduated in 1986. He then received a full CUSPEA scholarship to attend graduate school at Massachusetts Institute of Technology (MIT) in the United States. In 1993, Zhang graduated from MIT with a PhD in experimental physics. He then went on to serve as MIT's liaison officer for China.

While in the United States, Zhang developed an interest in pop culture and was an avid reader of Vanity Fair magazine. For a period, he aspired to a career in Hollywood and auditioned for roles after graduating from MIT.

== Career ==
After 7 years at MIT, Zhang joined Internet Securities Inc. (ISI) in November 1995 before returning to Beijing to establish the ISI China operation. While at ISI, Zhang envisioned an Internet search engine company. In 1996 with the support of MIT Media Lab director Nicholas Negroponte and MIT Sloan School of Management professor Edward B. Roberts, as well as venture capital, Zhang founded Internet Technologies China (ITC 爱特信公司), the first VC-funded Internet company in China.

In May 1997, after meeting Yahoo founder Jerry Yang, Zhang decided to transform ITC and rename the company Sohu. He subsequently oversaw four mergers with other Chinese internet companies to raise capital. On July 12, 2000, Sohu was listed on the NASDAQ Global Select Market. During the dot-com crash in the early 2000s, Sohu’s share price fell below US$1. Amid the downturn, several board members and investors sought to replace Zhang; however, he remained in his position. Zhang later attributed his ability to retain leadership in part to his non-confrontational management style.

In 2002, Sohu became the first profitable internet company in China. After Sohu established itself as one of the country’s leading internet firms, Zhang gradually withdrew from Sohu’s day-to-day management in the latter half of the 2000s and became a fixture in social and entertainment circles. In 2011, Zhang moved to the United States for treatment for depression and returned to China two years later in 2013.

During the 2010s, Sohu increasingly lagged behind its competitors. From 2018 to 2020, Sohu reported losses for three consecutive years. In 2021, the company returned to profitability, reporting a net profit of US$934 million.

== Controversy ==
=== Barbie Hsu's wedding images ===
In March 2011, Zhang attended the wedding of actress Barbie Hsu and businessman Wang Xiaofei, a star-studded ceremony held in Sanya that was closed to the media. Zhang posted live updates and photographs from the private event on Sohu Weibo without the couple’s consent, though with the approval of Wang’s mother, Zhang Lan. The postings, made amid intense competition among Chinese microblogging platforms, sparked a public dispute with the couple and strained Hsu's relationship with Taiwanese media, who viewed the exclusive dissemination of content to a mainland Chinese platform as preferential treatment. Following a demand letter from Hsu regarding the unauthorized photographing and posting of her wedding images, Zhang declined to issue an apology. Charles reconciled with Wang in 2015. In 2025, after Zhang Lan’s account on Douyin was banned for spreading misinformation following Hsu’s death, Charles invited her to stream on Sohu’s livestreaming platform, amid the renewed competition among Chinese livestreaming services.

== Personal life ==
Zhang has expressed the hope of living to the age of 150. He has stated that he believes stress plays a significant role in the aging process, and that practices such as yoga and an understanding of Buddhism can help reduce stress and promote longevity. Zhang also enjoys mountaineering.

== See also ==
- Sina.com
- Alibaba Group
- Jack Ma
- Mao Daolin
- Charles Chao
