= Wang Xing =

Chinese businessman

- 王兴
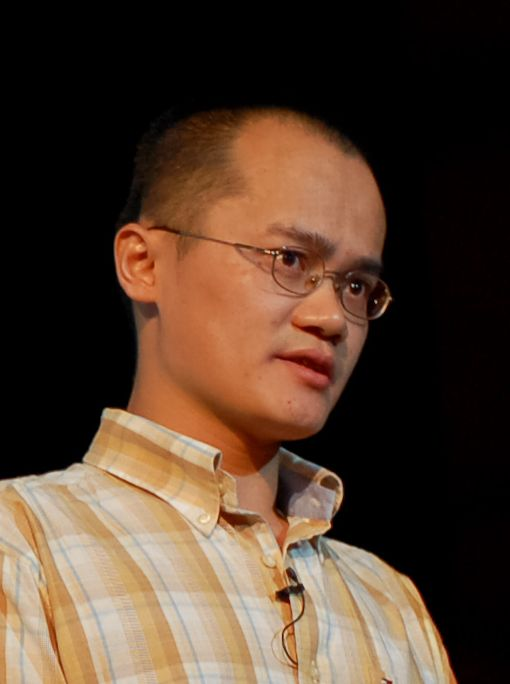
- Wang in 2009
- Born: 18 February 1979 (age 47); Longyan, China
- Education: Tsinghua University (BEng); University of Delaware (MS)
- Occupation: Businessman
- Known for: Internet entrepreneurship
- Title: Co-founder and CEO, Meituan

Wang Xing (Chinese: 王兴; born 18 February 1979) is a Chinese businessman who co-founded Meituan in 2010 and is its chairman and CEO. He previously co-founded the social network Xiaonei, later renamed Renren, and the microblogging service Fanfou.

== Early life and education ==
Wang Xing was born in 1979 in Longyan, Fujian, China.

Wang received a bachelor's degree in electronic engineering in 2001. He enrolled in a PhD program in computer engineering at the University of Delaware from 2001 to 2004, but dropped out with a master's degree in computer engineering.

== Business career ==
After leaving the University of Delaware, Wang returned to China to launch his business career. In his first technology startup, Wang along with a couple of friends, tried to create a Chinese version of the then-social networking site Friendster. His first such site, Duoduoyou (多多友), was a social network for a general audience. After Duoduoyou failed to take off, he started Youzitu (游子图; lit. 'Traveller's Map') for Chinese students abroad but the site eventually ceased operation.

In 2005, Wang created a Chinese version of Facebook called Xiaonei (校内网; lit. 'Inside-Campus Net'). The site gained users quickly, and in 2006 Wang, unable to pay for more servers and bandwidth, sold it to Oak Pacific Interactive. The new owners re-branded the site, renamed Renren (人人网; lit. 'People–People Net').

In 2007, Wang created a Chinese version of Twitter called Fanfou (饭否; lit. 'Dinner or Not'). It was one of China's first microblogging services. The government shut it down in July 2009, after the Ürümqi riots. It was eventually permitted to reopen but by then, other Chinese microblogging sites like Sina Weibo and Tencent Weibo had entered the market and captured substantial market share.

In 2010, Wang established the Chinese group-buying site Meituan, which was based on the business model of Groupon. Meituan merged with Dianping in 2015.

== 2021 poem post ==
On 3 May 2021, Wang posted a Tang Dynasty (618–907 AD) poem about book burning on social media platform Fanfou. The action was reported by Quartz News as a veiled swipe against the general secretaryship of Xi Jinping's clampdown on civil society, intellectual and academic freedom since ascension to office. The poem, by Zhang Jie, entitled "Book Burning Pit," speaks about the emperor Qin Shi Huang's practice of beheading scholars and burning books, only to be overthrown by illiterate rebels later during his reign.

As a result of the post, Meituan's shares plunged 7.1% on the same day, wiping $36.98 billion from the company's market cap over the subsequent weeks. The firm also subsequently came under scrutiny from the Beijing Municipal Human Resources and Social Security Bureau and became the target of an anti-monopoly investigation from the State Administration of Market Regulation, reported by Bloomberg News as political reaction for Wang's post.
