= Bultoo Radio =

Mobile-based communication service

Bultoo Radio is a unique mobile-based communication service which uses Bluetooth technology to exchange news of local issues and entertainment content in media dark zones. It was launched in 2015 in Chhattisgarh state of India by CGNet Swara, a citizen journalism platform, in collaboration with the state government. Bultoo radio aims to provide a common ground for Adivasi tribals and non-Adivasis to communicate and share content, ranging from recreational stories to problem messages, in their local languages. These stories are then converted to audio programmes and transmitted.

== Etymology ==
In 2015, Shubhranshu Choudhary, the co-founder of CGNet Swara, a citizen journalism platform based in central India, noticed a group of Adivasi kids playing with their mobile phones in Barwani district, of Madhya Pradesh. When he enquired about their activity, one of them replied “We are doing Bultoo, sir.” Shubhranshu understood that the kids were transferring pictures and videos using Bluetooth on their phones. And this gave him the idea of starting Bultoo Radio – a radio programme that people receive on their phones via Bluetooth in their local language.

Out of the three types of access to communication technologies - handset with internet and mobile network access, handset with mobile signal but no internet access, and no access to mobile or internet signals; Bultoo radio taps into the third section of population that neither has a mobile handset nor internet signal.

== How it works ==
The ‘Bultoo’ radio or ‘Voicebook’ programme began in 2015. It encouraged users to record local news on their telephones and approach trained citizen journalists in their localities to transfer content via Bluetooth despite no internet and phone connectivity. The news recorded by the users was first verified and then converted into audio programmes. These programmes were then uploaded to the CGNet Swara website, and could be downloaded by gram panchayats that had broadband facilities. A community media vendor downloaded them at the gram panchayat office and then went house to house to deliver ‘Bultoo’ radio to villagers’ phones. An improved interface was later launched in 2019, enabling the recordings to be easily shared via an app, Bultoo app.

An alternate way of transmission is approaching people in weekly markets, called haats. Bultoo Radio program is shared with at least one person from each village, who then shares it with the village residents once back in the village. An incentive in the form of mobile top ups per transfer is given to the person who has the bultoo app on his/her phone once s/he reaches the internet zone. When people listen to mobile radio programs over phone signal it is often very expensive as each second of mobile use costs but when it is transferred using Bluetooth the cost comes down drastically, so CGNet Swara is encouraging the use of Bultoo also in mobile signal areas to minimise costs.

== Impact ==
The Abujmarh region, home to a mix of indigenous tribes including Gonds, Muria, Abuj Maria and Halbaas, is the hotbed of Maoist insurgency, rendering it inaccessible and technologically underdeveloped. By making use of the basic handset, Bultoo radio aims to give these tribal communities a voice- a platform to report local happenings, grievances and record folklore and songs.

Pahadi Korwa is a small tribal community in Central India and their language and culture is on the verge of extinction. With CGNet’s involvement, Pahadi Korwas are being trained to report and use Bultoo using their handsets, with special workshops in the local language. As an implication, the younger generation has been exposed to the Pahari Korwa language via Bultoo radio and the older generation is sharing traditional knowledge of medicine and food from the forest.

For migrants in settlements in Telangana and Andhra Pradesh, CGNet Swara operates a different Bultoo Radio service in the Dorla language (a variant of Gondi mixed with Telugu).

From October 4 to December 24, 2019, a total of 528 stories were reported through the app by 117 unique users. Within a month of deployment, there were nearly 21,000 transfers of content via Bluetooth to more than 2,400 phones. The content ranged from folk songs to community problems, mainly non-functional handpumps and delayed payments in government work schemes.

== Milestones ==
During the experimental phase of Bultoo radio, CGNet was invited to meet the Prime Minister, Narendra Modi, in Delhi during an agricultural conference. Presentations were made keeping in mind the use of mobile phones and digital technology for effective communication in rural areas, especially among farmers, and Bultoo radio was seen as a project worth emulating for farmers. Collector of Chhattisgarh’s Balrampur-Ramanujganj district, Alex Paul Menon, accompanied the team to the conference and said that they are working on narrow-casting of programmes in local dialect rather than broadcasting a radio programme. "Any message including Swachh Bharat Abhiyaan has greater impact when people get them through the dialect that they understand," he added.
