= Trucker Path =

Trucking industry service provider

- Type: Subsidiary
- Industry: Transportation technology
- Founders: Viktor Radchenko, Ivan Tsybaev
- Headquarters: Phoenix, Arizona, U.S.
- Key people: Joseph Chen (CEO)
- Services: Road transport, logistics
- Parent: Renren
- Website: truckerpath.com

Trucker Path is an American transportation network company specializing in online and mobile services for the trucking industry. In early 2013, the company released its trip planning and resource locating mobile app, Trucker Path. In mid-2015, it was followed by TruckLoads, a marketplace available on the web and mobile devices specializing in connecting freight companies with carriers. By March 2015, the Trucker Path app had 100,000 users. One year later, Trucker Path reached one million downloads on iOS and Android combined. By June 2016, the number of active monthly users surpassed 450,000, which represented 30% of all Class 8 truckers in the U.S. TruckLoads became the most installed freight-matching mobile app with over 250,000 installs by the end of 2016. In February 2017, Trucker Path reached over 1.5 million total installs and is the first in the trucking industry to have over one million installs on the Google Play Store. In December 2017, Renren announced that it acquired Trucker Path.

== History ==
The early version of the application for truck drivers was developed by Viktor Radchenko, who was inspired to create it after hearing his trucker friends complain about the difficulties they had finding truck stops. Trucker Path was the fourth application Radchenko had developed since moving to Silicon Valley from his native Ukraine in 2010. Before creating Trucker Path, he did not have any direct involvement in the freight industry.

The early beta version of the app was launched in February 2013, and by August had reached 50,000 active weekly users. In October 2013, Radchenko began working together with Ivan Tsybaev to found the company officially, with Tsybaev acting as the organization's first CEO and Radchenko as the chief technology officer. Tsybaev envisioned the company becoming a freight transportation marketplace. To build up a user base, he decided to focus on positioning Trucker Path as a crowdsourced navigational assistant that would make it easy for truckers to plan their trips by helping them find truck stops, parking, rest areas, washers, and other points of interest. Initially, the application focused on providing trucking information primarily for the United States but has since added locations across Canada.

At the 2013 LA Auto Show, Trucker Path was named one of the eight finalists for Fastpitch, a competition for automobile-related startups. In February 2014, Radchenko left his job as chief technology officer at Trucker Path.

In September 2014, the company raised US$1.5 million in seed funding from Renren, a China-based social media company founded by an American citizen and MIT/Stanford graduate Joseph Chen. Renren prefers to invest in U.S.-based companies that have the potential to expand into China. Their other investments include SoFi, a digital finance and p2p lending company, and a Swiss-Israeli secure mobile phone company Sirin Labs.

In June 2015, Trucker Path raised $20 million in a Series A round from Chicago-based Wicklow Capital. The round involved a follow-on partner, Chinese social media giant Renren.

In July 2015, Trucker Path released Truckloads, a B2B marketplace specializing in connecting transportation brokers to carriers. Initially, the application was available only by invite. Between July 2015 and February 2016, Truckloads was available as a public beta.

By February 2017, the app had surpassed 250,000 downloads on Google Play and the App Store. The app features InstaPay, a payment system which guarantees payment to approved truckers within 24 hours.

Trucker Path funding also included $30 million in debt financing which it secured through Flexible Funding which the company says it's using to fund its freight factoring service InstaPay for owner operators and small fleets.

According to CEO Ivan Tsybaev, the popularity of Trucker Path and other trucking applications correlates with the smartphone adoption rate in the industry. He believes that the primary effect of these apps will be replacing dispatchers for owner-operator drivers.

In December 2017, Renren announced that it acquired Trucker Path for an undisclosed amount.

In March 2018, Trucker Path's freight factoring service InstaPay was fully acquired by Flexible Funding Ltd for an undisclosed amount.

== Trucker Path application ==
The main Trucker Path app for iOS and Android provides truck drivers with various information, e.g. parking availability, locations of truck stops, verified Walmart locations with truck parking, check a weigh station's status, and find truck wash facilities.

In March 2016, Trucker Path received an update that added Fuel View, a feature that allows drivers to see and compare fuel prices on the map.

Of the 6,000+ truck stops listed in the Trucker Path database, 3,277 are independently run. The data on those stops was gathered based on user-generated input and ratings. Collected from over 500,000 active users, that information allows truckers to plan their parking and spend less time searching for available spots, which is an increasingly important safety issue facing the industry, according to a study by the Federal Highway Administration.

In February 2017, Trucker Path reached over one million downloads on the Google Play Store and 1.5 million total downloads. It is also the highest-rated app in the trucking industry, receiving an overall 4.7-star rating (out of 5) on Android based on the input from more than 34,000 users.

== TruckLoads application ==
Launched in July 2015, TruckLoads enables its users to quickly tap into available trucking capacity across all North American markets. The platform includes a mobile app for truckers that helps them find available loads and a web-based panel for freight brokers, which they use to see nearby trucking capacity and post loads for moving.

After a period of beta testing, TruckLoads has been downloaded more than 250,000 times and has shown an average 20% monthly growth. More than 2 million loads are posted on the platform every month, also allowing carriers access to unlimited premium loads. TruckLoads offers freight companies the opportunity to post their loads for over 80,000 qualified carriers to view. More than 250,000 owner-operators have installed and use the app.
