= C2C =

C2C may stand for:

== Transport ==
- c2c, an English train operating company
- c2c (1996–2025), a former English train operating company
- Sea to Sea Cycle Route, a bicycle route in England
- Coast-to-Coast Trail, a multi-use path in Florida currently under construction

== Entertainment ==
- C2C (group), French DJ group
- C2C (studio), a Japanese animation studio
- C2C: Country to Country, a country music festival in London
- Cover to Cover tour, a 1991 tour by George Michael
- Coast to Coast AM, a syndicated AM talk radio show

== Technology ==
- C2C (cable system), linking east Asia and the United States
- Click-to-call, a web technology to immediately initiate calls to another person
- Consumer-to-consumer, electronic transactions between consumers through a third party
- Cradle-to-cradle design, a biomimetic approach to the design of products

== Other ==
- Coast to Coast Athletic Conference, a US college athletic conference
- Copy to China, when a Chinese company copies the business model of a successful foreign company
