= Soso (search engine) =

Chinese search engine

- Former logo
- Website type: Search engine
- Available in: Chinese
- Owner: Tencent Holdings Limited
- Website: soso.com
- Commercial: Yes
- Registration: Optional
- Current status: Merged with Sogou

Soso (Chinese: 搜搜; pinyin: Sōusōu) was a Chinese search engine owned by Tencent Holdings Limited, which is well known for its other creations Pengyou and QQ. As of 1 October 2012, Soso was ranked as the 33rd most visited website in the world, the 11th most visited website in China, and the number eight most visited website in South Korea, according to Alexa Internet.

In September 2013, Tencent invested in Sogou, a subsidiary of Sohu. At this point, Soso discontinued services and now redirects to Sogou Search. Sogou also has search results in English which is powered by Bing.
