= Baidu Space =

Baidu Space (Chinese: 百度空间) was an online social networking service provided by Baidu where users could record and share their lives easily. Users could also find people who have the same interests as their friends and communicate with them. It was launched on July 13, 2006. The slogan of Baidu Space is Let the world find you.

It was listed as Number 11 on the Top Social Media Sites of 2008 with 40 million unique worldwide visitors [source: November, 2008; comScore].

On April 4, 2015, Baidu announced that Baidu Space will be closed. All content on Baidu Space was transferred to Baidu Cloud on May 7, 2015.

== See also ==
- Pengyou
- 56.com
- FaceKoo
- Microdot
- Internet in China
