= Meituan =

Chinese technology company

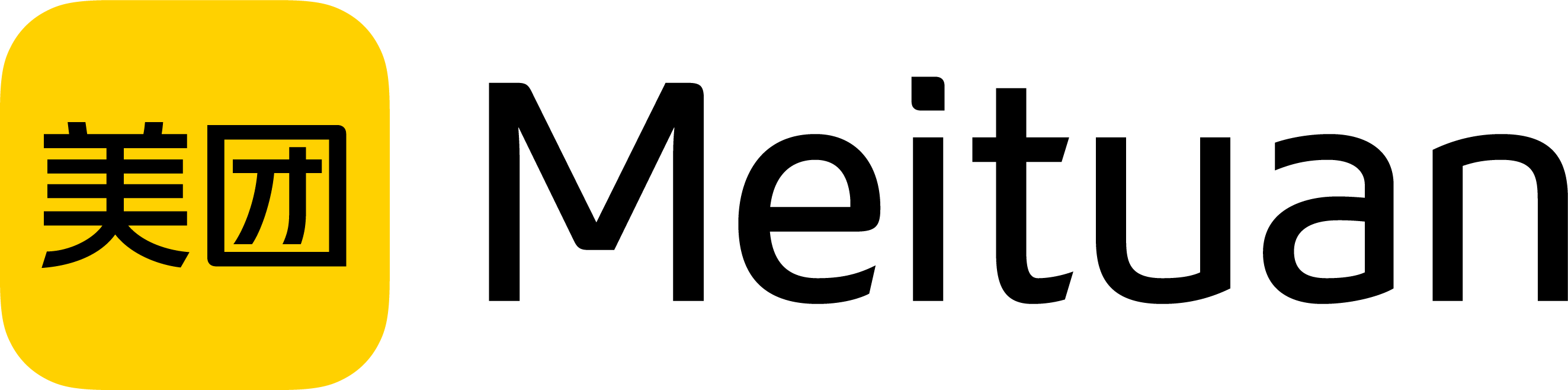
- Meituan logo with name in English
- Company type: Public
- Available in: Chinese
- Traded as: SEHK: 3690; OTCID Basic: MPNGY; Hang Seng Index component
- Founded: May 2010
- Headquarters: Beijing, China
- No. of locations: 1000+
- Area served: China
- Founder: Wang Xing
- Key people: Wang Xing, Fu Lihui, Mu Rongjun, Liang Foxing, Chen Mei Wah
- Industry: Internet company
- Services: Voucher selling
- Revenue: ▲CN¥364.9 billion (US$53.82 billion, 2025)
- Employees: 110,000 (2026)
- Subsidiaries: DianPing; Mobike (Mobike (Beijing) Information Technology Co., Ltd); Shanghai Han Tao Information Consultation Co. Ltd. Chongqing Sankuai Micro-credit Co., Ltd; Inspire Elite Investments Limited; Beijing Kuxun Interactive Technology Co., Ltd. BeyondHost Technology; Hucheng Information Technology (Shanghai) Co., Ltd. Beijing Kuxun Interation Technology Co. Ltd; Beijing Sankuai Cloud Computing Technology Co., Ltd. Meituan Corp; Tianjin Wanlong Technology Co., Ltd; Qiandai (Beijing) Information Technology Co. Ltd. Inspired Elite Investment Limited; Haizi Xuesha; Tianjin Xiaoyi Technology Co., Ltd; Sankuai Cloud Online (Beijing) Technology Co., Ltd; Shanghai Sankuai Zhisong Technology Co., Ltd; Shenzhen Sankuai Online Technology Co., Ltd, Tianjin Sankuai Technology Co. Ltd. Xiamen Sankuai Online Technology Co., Ltd; Shanghai Juzuo Technology Co., Ltd
- Website: www.meituan.com
- Advertising: Yes
- Launched: March 29, 2009; 17 years ago
- Current status: Active

Meituan
- Simplified Chinese: 美团
- Traditional Chinese: 美團
- Literal meaning: beautiful group
Transcriptions
Standard Mandarin
- Hanyu Pinyin: Měituán
Yue: Cantonese
- Yale Romanization: Méihtyùhn

Meituan (Chinese: 美团; pinyin: Měituán; formerly Meituan–Dianping) is a Chinese technology company that operates a platform for local services including on‑demand food delivery, in‑store services and consumer reviews under the Dazhong Dianping brand, hotel and travel bookings, and instant retail. The company is headquartered in Beijing and was founded in 2010 by Wang Xing. The company launched an initial public offering on the Hong Kong Stock Exchange in September 2018.

By the end of 2024, Meituan had over 770 million annual transacting users and over 14.5 million annual active merchants on its platform.

Its international brand name used outside of mainland China is Keeta.

== History ==
Piloted in Shanghai and Beijing, Meituan had rapidly expanded to second-tier and third-tier cities, totalling 200 million users in 2015. Meituan.com became a dominant company in China after a rapid consolidation of the deal-of-the-day companies. Earlier estimates show that there were 2000 voucher selling companies in the mid-2000s, and due to intense competition in the industry only a few have emerged as dominant players. In 2014 it accounted for 60% of the market share of deal-of-the-day group-buying websites in China. The company received initial funding of $12 million from Sequoia Capital. In May 2014, global growth equity firm General Atlantic led a $300 million Series C funding round with two other investors. On October 8, 2015, Meituan and Dianping, a Chinese group buying site, became one company. On January 19, 2016, Meituan Dianping announced that it has raised more than $3.3 billion. On September 20, 2018, Meituan Dianping debuted on the Hong Kong stock exchange at an IPO price of HK$69 per share.

The company was renamed from "Meituan Dianping" to Meituan with effect from September 30, 2020.

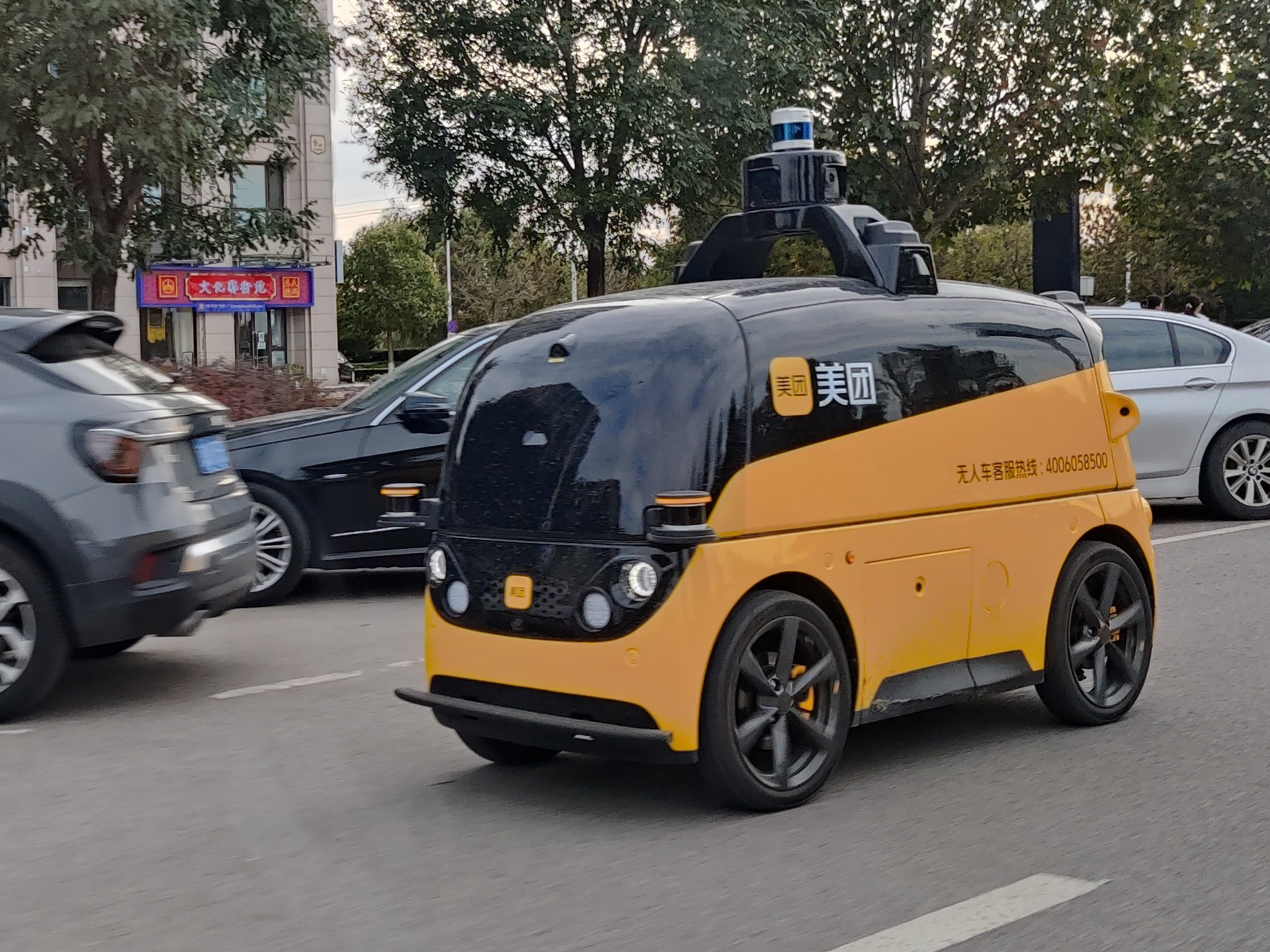
Meituan autonomous delivery vehicle

In April 2021, Meituan raised $9.98 billion in additional financing via the sale of $3 billion in convertible bonds and $7 billion in equities. The funds will be used to expand into China's groceries space as well as to develop autonomous technologies in the drone and delivery space. The same month, the State Administration of Market Regulation announced an investigation into Meituan for alleged anticompetitive practices. By May 2021, increased regulatory scrutiny led to almost $40 billion being wiped from the company's overall value. Ultimately, Meituan accepted a fine without making any appeal and stated that it would comply with regulatory requirements in the future.

In May 2023, Meituan's Hong Kong takeaway platform "Keeta" officially launched its services, with the first service pilot located in Mong Kok and Tai Kok Tsui, marking the first time that Meituan has offered its services outside of mainland China.

In September 2026, it was reported that the government was investigating companies in the technology space, including Meituan, for possible violations of unfair competition law.

== Products and services ==
=== Food delivery ===
Meituan's food delivery option, established in 2013, has become central to its revenue stream with the pandemic accelerating demand for food delivery adoption. Widely used, the service has emerged as a key driver of user engagement on the platform, pushing traffic to other offerings such as hotel and travel bookings. Meituan is the largest food delivery platform in China, holding a majority share of over 65% in the Chinese food delivery business, with its main competitor, Ele.me holding less than 30%.

=== On demand services ===
Meituan is in the on-demand retail service industry with its organization and logistics, as well as its supply and delivery chain infrastructure network to enable a guaranteed delivery system. This network consists of 2,800 counties and cities in China, and more than 1 million daily active delivery drivers and 5.27 million delivery drivers earning on Meituan in 2021. Within their on demand services, Meituan has several programs that provide different services, ranging from instant delivery to next day delivery, depending on the tier of city.

Meituan Instashopping Service - This provides small and medium-sized businesses the ability to digitize and offer its products through instant delivery and/or next day delivery. Order volume has increased by 40% year over year, active merchants are increasing by 30% year over year, partnering with over 400 brands and offering services in over 200 cities in China. Consumers can order flowers, medicine, and various items from local supermarkets and convenience stores. This is offered in up to tier three cities.

Meituan Grocery (“美團買菜”) - Now upgraded to Xiaoxiang Supermarket (“小象超市”), which marks the official transition from grocery to online supermarket in 2023, where users can get instant/fresh products such as fresh produce and pharmaceuticals/medicine though instant delivery. The supply chain for Meituan grocery operates in Tier 1 cities.

Meituan Select (“美團優選”) - Provides next day delivery for non-immediate demand products such as appliances, apparel, necessities, operating in lower-tier markets. Launched in 2020 in China during the COVID-19 pandemic, the online platform uses a bulk purchasing model grouping orders and enabling cost savings for customers. By the beginning of 2021, Meituan Select covered more than 20 provinces using Meituan's well-established logistics network to optimize delivery and efficiency. Meituan-Select worked as an "next-day supermarket," delivering products to designated pick-up spots, such as local shops, where customers could collect their orders.

The platform's commercialization model, offering discounts, and bulk purchasing allowed it to generate significant GMV, placing the company ahead of its competitors such as Duo Duo Grocery (Pinduoduo), and Taocaicai (Alibaba). However, the company faced many different obstacles like government regulations, aggressive competitions, and financial losses. Regulation from the government in 2021 made Meituan pay fines for predatory pricing and false advertising.

In response to these challenges, Meituan reorganized its operations and adopted cost-cutting strategies. That made Meituan shift its strategy to improving supply chain efficiency and profitability by achieving positive margins by 2023.

=== Hotel and travel services ===
Meituan entered the hotel and travel services space in 2015. Since then, it has expanded partnerships with over 900 hotel chains. Recent boosts in tourism have also helped to expand the business segment with a year over year (YoY) booking increase of 120%. More recently Meituan has increased its offerings to include coupon and package deals. Their broad network allows them to adapt to consumer preferences and trends for brand awareness. Meituan also leverages its data analytics to provide smaller and medium-sized hotel merchants with tools to drive traffic, improve room renovation solutions, and expand their marketing strategies. Recent developments include a recent partnership with Agoda, an online travel agency, to better cater to Chinese tourists traveling abroad and enhance services for overseas travel. Similar to recent developments by Pinduoduo with its Duo Duo live, Meituan's expansion into the livestream model has also helped merchants engage with users to promote destinations through virtual tours.

=== Bike sharing and e-bike sharing ===
Meituan acquired Mobike in April 2017 for US$2.7 billion. Meituan is responsible for production, operation, and disposal of these bikes and e-mopeds.

=== Artificial intelligence ===
Meituan entered the artificial intelligence sector in 2023 by acquiring the AI startup Light Year for US$281 million. In September 2025, the company released its first open-source large language model, LongCat-Flash-Chat. Subsequent releases include LongCat-Flash-Thinking, featuring Chain-of-thought capabilities; LongCat-Flash-Omni, a multimodal model; and LongCat-Flash-Lite, a fast, low-cost Mixture of Experts model. In October 2025, Meituan released LongCat-Video, a model optimized for efficient long-video generation. This was followed, in December 2025, by LongCat-Image, a small 6 billion parameter image generation model that emphasized data quality over the number of parameters.

In June 2026, Meituan released LongCat-2.0, a 1.6-trillion-parameter model trained on 50,000 Chinese microchips, under the MIT License. Meituan did not disclose the chips' manufacturer, but stated in a WeChat post that it had used a software library from Huawei for inter-chip communication, and noted that it needed to compensate for the domestic chips' lower memory capacity and less mature software ecosystem compared to Nvidia's H800 GPUs. Prior to launch, the company had made a pre-release version of LongCat-2.0 available under the name "Owl Alpha" on the OpenRouter inference service.

Meituan has applied its AI technology to its core food and hotel businesses through Xiaomei. Xiaomei is an AI agent, powered by Meituan's LongCat models, that assists customers with food delivery purchases and hotel bookings.

=== Other services ===
Meituan also offers many other services and smaller initiatives, such as a business-to-business food distribution service (快驴), power-bank-sharing, micro-lending, and a restaurant management system (RMS) initiative.

== New developments ==
=== Unmanned aerial vehicles ===
In 2023, Meituan began using unmanned aerial vehicles (UAVs) for urban logistics deliveries. The UAVs have a maximum delivery distance of five kilometers and can operate in inclement weather. In May 2023, Meituan and Pony.ai announced a partnership in which Meituan would license the company's technology to support the expansion its UAV delivery services in China's first-tier cities.

=== Self driving delivery vehicles ===
Meituan introduced self-driving vehicles in 2021, focusing on expanding into densely populated cities such as Shanghai, Beijing, and Shenzhen. Through a partnership with Li Auto Inc. Meituan leverages the company's intellectual property to advance its autonomous vehicle development. The IP license includes Li Auto's SEV model's complete vehicle design plan, molds, and tooling.

== Foreign expansion ==
Meituan's foreign expansion began with the launch of the Keeta delivery app in Hong Kong in 2023, followed by expansion into the Middle East and Brazil.

=== Asia ===
==== Hong Kong ====
In May 2023 Meituan launched its first food delivery service - named Keeta. It was the first time Meituan offered its products outside of mainland China. Keeta began operating in the districts of Mong Kok and Tai Kok Tsui, with plans to expand to the rest of Hong Kong by the end of 2023.

=== Middle East ===
==== Saudi Arabia ====
In September 2024 Meituan launched its platform Keeta in Riyadh, Saudi Arabia offering free deliveries and discounts during its initial launch phase for customers. Meituan announced plans to capture up to 80% of the Saudi Arabian food delivery market by 2025. Keeta's expansion plans align with Saudi Arabia's vision for 2030, with an investment of SR1 billion ($266.6 million) to improve operations, create jobs, and enhance services. Keeta focuses on affordability, diverse range of restaurants, faster delivery and tailored customer experience to progress in the Saudi Arabian market. Meituan CEO Wang Xing stated that international expansion is part of Meituan's long-term strategy.

Qatar

In August 2025, Keeta expanded into Qatar.

United Arab Emirates

In September 2025, Keeta expanded to the United Arab Emirates, launching in Dubai on September 27, with plans to subsequently expand to other parts of the country.

=== Latin America ===
Brazil

In October 2025, Keeta entered the market for food delivery in Brazil.

== Management ==
The company is headquartered in Beijing and was founded in 2010 by Wang Xing. Prior to starting Meituan, Wang founded Xiaonei and Fanfou, which were based on Facebook and Twitter respectively.
