= The Internet Age =

- Also known as: Hulianwang Shidai

Chinese name
- Traditional Chinese: 互聯網時代
- Simplified Chinese: 互联网时代
Transcriptions
Standard Mandarin
- Hanyu Pinyin: Hùliánwǎng Shídaì
- Genre: Documentary
- Directed by: Shi Qiang; Sun Zengtian
- Country of origin: China
- Original language: Mandarin
- No. of episodes: 10

Production
- Executive producer: Yang Ye
- Producer: Zhang Zheng
- Production location: China
- Running time: 50 minutes per episode
- Production companies: CCTV; China Television Media, Ltd

Original release
- Network: CCTV-2
- Release: 25 August – 4 September 2014

The Internet Age is a 10-part Chinese documentary television series produced by CCTV. It was first broadcast on CCTV-2 from 25 August 2014 to 4 September 2014. It discusses the "Internet".

== List of episodes ==
The original titles of the 10 episodes (in Chinese) are listed as follows, each with an accompanying rough translation in English.

1. 《时代》 (Age)
2. 《浪潮》 (Wave)
3. 《能量》 (Energy)
4. 《再构》 (Reconstruction)
5. 《崛起》 (Rise)
6. 《迁徙》 (Migration)
7. 《控制》 (Control)
8. 《忧虑》 (Worry)
9. 《世界》 (World)
10. 《眺望》 (Overlooking)

== Commentators ==
- The following are commentators who appear on the miniseries:
- Manuel Castells
- Tim Berners-Lee
- Nicholas Negroponte
- Jerry Yang
- Kevin Kelly
- Bob Kahn
- Elon Musk
- Thomas Friedman
- Michael Moritz
- Chris Anderson
- Reid Hoffman
- Robert Taylor
- Lawrence Summers
- Lawrence Roberts
- John Naisbitt
- Robert Metcalfe
- Xu Rongsheng (许榕生)
- Hu Qiheng (胡启恒)
- Ma Yun
- Zhang Chaoyang
- Ding Lei
- Charles Zhang
- Zhou Hongwei
