= FreeWeibo =

Website set up to circumvent censorship on Weibo

FreeWeibo (自由微博)
- Website type: Microblogging
- Available in: Simplified Chinese/English
- Owner: Independent
- Website: freeweibo.com
- Commercial: Yes
- Registration: Required
- Launched: October 2012

FreeWeibo (Chinese: 自由微博) is a website that monitors and makes available content from leading Chinese microblogging site Sina Weibo that has been censored and deleted by Chinese authorities under the Great Firewall. The home page is constantly updated to show the latest most-censored Weibo content.

The site allows searches for any deleted microblogging strings and content, such as the names of dissidents, "64", "tiananmen", dalai (as in Dalai Lama, specifically the 14th Dalai Lama), "Xinjiang independence", "Winnie the Pooh", and terms related to any breaking news deemed sensitive. In addition, there are many terms relating to advertising content, pornography and so on.

== History ==
The founder of the site goes by the name "Martin Johnson". According to Deutsche Welle, he describes his mission as: breaking Chinese Internet censorship and creating a free Internet. The establishment of the FreeWeibo site specifically targets system-deleted posts on Sina Weibo, Twitter, and other large community websites, since around 12 percent of all posts for other Weibo platforms are removed by censors.

== Concept ==
The United States magazine Quartz reported that one of the three founders of the site, "Charlie Smith", said out of concern about the CCP's censorship, they established in 2011 the Chinese website GreatFire with the aim to provide a resource to clearly show what was blocked.

== Operation ==
"Martin Johnson" said that, like all major sites in China, Sina Weibo employs its own censors. They would manually remove content deemed sensitive, as automatic filtering cannot catch all such posts. Many comments are live for a few minutes or even hours before they are reviewed and deleted, so FreeWeibo makes use of this loophole and collect those posts. "Charlie Smith" said that they copy every Sina Weibo post, but this approach requires a huge storage capacity. According to the Deutsche Welle report, to access the FreeWeibo page from within China, people must use VPN software to bypass the authorities.

== Objectives ==
In the Quartz report, "Charlie Smith" expected to defeat the censorship system with FreeWeibo. He said he would continue to pressure the Chinese government until they give up the practice.

== Mobile app ==
On October 4, 2013, the outfit released an app version of the site in the Chinese Apple App Store in a collaboration with Radio Netherlands Worldwide. However, under pressure from the Government of China, Apple took down the app on November 28.

== Awards ==
- 2013: Winner of Deutsche Welle "The Bobs" for Best Innovation.
- 2014: Nominated for the Index on Censorship's Freedom of Expression Awards in digital activism.

== See also ==
- Internet censorship in China
