= Xi'an Middle School of Shaanxi Province =

School in Xi'an, China

Xi'an Middle School of Shaanxi Province (陕西省西安中学) is a senior high school in Xi'an, Shaanxi, China.

It was established in 1905.

Notable alumni include Charles Zhang and Wei Jiangchun (魏江春).

The school is located in Fengcheng 5th Road of Xi’an Economic and Technological Development Zone.

The school begins to teach aircraft students this year.

In 2015, its branch school Xi'an Jingkai Middle school was established.

The school have made great relationships with many international friend schools.

There are great sources of teaching.
