= Edward B. Roberts =

American academic (1935–2024)

Edward Baer Roberts
- Born: November 18, 1935; Chelsea, Massachusetts, U.S.
- Died: February 27, 2024 (aged 88); Boston, Massachusetts, U.S.
- Education: Earned Bachelor's and Master's degrees in Engineering, an MBA, and a Ph.D. in Economics, all from MIT
- Occupation: Faculty member at the MIT Sloan School of Management
- Employer(s): Sloan School of Management, Massachusetts Institute of Technology

Edward Baer Roberts (November 18, 1935 – February 27, 2024) was an American academic who was faculty member at the MIT Sloan School of Management. He became the David Sarnoff Professor of Management of Technology in 1974.

== Life and career ==
Roberts, the world’s leading authority on entrepreneurship, wrote "Entrepreneurs in High Technology: Lessons from MIT and Beyond" on high-tech business creation and growth. The book won the Association of American Publishers Award for Outstanding Book in Business and Management in 1991. Dr. Roberts was the David Sarnoff Professor of Management of Technology at the Massachusetts Institute of Technology, the Chair of the Sloan School’s Management of Technological Innovation & Entrepreneurship research and education programs, and the founder and chair of the MIT Entrepreneurship Center.

Roberts earned Bachelor’s and Master’s degrees in Engineering, an MBA, and the world’s first Ph.D. in System Dynamics, all from MIT. He has authored over 150 articles and 11 books, most recently Innovation: Driving Product, Process and Market Change.

Entrepreneurial in academia and industry, under the direction of MIT Professor Jay Forrester, Dr. Roberts was a founding member of the System Dynamics field at the MIT Sloan School of Management and the MIT System Dynamics Group in 1958. System Dynamics, formerly known as Industrial Dynamics, was developed from a need to better understand highly complex problems through their feedback systems and how they change over time.

Roberts was a co-founder, director, adviser, mentor, and angel investor in many emerging companies. For 20 years, he co-founded and was a General Partner in the Zero Stage and First Stage Capital Equity Funds, venture capital funds specializing in early-stage technology firms. He co-founded and was CEO of Pugh-Roberts Associates, an international management consulting firm specializing in strategic planning and technology management (now a division of PA Consulting Group). He also co-founded and served as a Director of Sohu.com, a leading Chinese Internet firm.

Roberts served on the board of advisors of Maverick Ventures Israel, a unique venture capital fund composed of private investors which invests in early growth Israeli startups.

In 1996, he helped Charles Zhang found the company ITC, which later became Sohu, one of China's biggest Internet companies.

Roberts died in Boston on February 27, 2024, at the age of 88.
