= Mao Daolin =

Chinese businessman

- Other name: Daniel Mao
- Education: Stanford University
- Occupation: Venture Capitalist
- Children: See list: Amelia

Mao Daolin (Chinese: 茅道林; pinyin: Máo Dàolín; born January 1963) is an internet entrepreneur. He is a former chief executive officer of Sina.com.

== Biography ==
Mao was born in 1963 in Shanghai. He graduated from Shanghai East-China Model High School in 1980. Mao then entered the Computer Department of Shanghai Jiaotong University. Later he went to Stanford University for a master's degree.

Since graduating from Shanghai East-China Model High School in 1980, Mao has been heavily involved in the computer industry. He started his own software company in 1982 and later served as a consultant from 1988 to 1993. The following year, in 1984, he joined Walden, an international risk investment company, as a vice-president.

Mao was in a relationship with Hu Haiqing, daughter of Hu Jintao, until October 2024.
