= Kaixin001 =

Chinese social networking website

Kaixin001 开心网
- Website type: Social network service
- Available in: Chinese
- Commercial: Yes
- Registration: Required
- Launched: April 2008
- Current status: Inactive

Kaixin001 (Chinese: 开心网; pinyin: Kāixīnwǎng; lit. 'Happy Net') is a social networking website launched in March 2008.

In 2015, Kaixin001 ranks as the 743rd most popular website in China and 7,277 overall according to Alexa Internet.

On 20 May 2009, Kaixin001 formally sued Qianxiang Group for unfair competition. Qianxiang Group runs one of China's popular social networks Renren. It purchased the kaixin.com domain and launched a Kaixin001 clone. This enables Renren to confuse users and attract some Kaixin001 potential users to the Kaixin.com clone. In October 2011, Kaixin001 won a victory. The Beijing Second Intermediate People's Court ordered Oak Pacific to cease all use of kaixin.com and pay 400,000 renminbi ($60,000) in damages. The other main competition for Kaixin001 is Weibo.com, a microblogging website with more than 250 million daily users and is owned by Sina.com.

== Applications ==
Kaixin001 was one of the launchers of the social video games craze in China.

Some of these games include:

- Friends for Sale
- Parking Wars
- iLike
- Where I’ve Been

== Advertising Campaign ==
Kaixin001 focused on advertisements planted into its products. Some of these cases made a such a success that many users were unaware it was even an advertisement. For example, in 2009 and 2010, players of Kaixin001's Happy Garden could plant seeds and squeeze juice for Lohas, a soft drink made by COFCO, China's biggest food manufacturer; the game also gave players the option to enter a lottery to win Lohas. Another example was that players of Happy Restaurant could earn virtual currency by hanging ads for companies on the walls of their virtual eateries. After meals, they can also hand out sticks of Wrigley's gum.

== Mobile Games ==
After the Chinese internet company Tencent invested in Kaixin001 in 2011, Kaixin001 began to develop its own mobile games. By July 2014, Kaixin001 released 18 mobile games, the most successful one was named Clash of Three Kingdoms, a simulation mobile game. It also conducted international business, with its revenue from Korea and Taiwan at more than US$6 million per month.

== See also ==
- Renren
