= Sina Sports =

Chinese sports reporter

- Type: Private
- Industry: Sports digital media
- Headquarters: Beijing, China
- Area served: China
- Products: Sina Sports website, mobile site, mobile app
- Number of employees: 200
- Website: sports.sina.com.cn

Sina Sports is a Chinese digital sports media platform that provides live sporting events, highlights, news, discussion forums and other related sports content, primarily targeted at Chinese communities around the world. It is a subsidiary of Chinese internet company Sina.com and was established in 1998 as China's first online sports platform.

The platform operates an online website, mobile website, and mobile app, all of which are only available in the Chinese language. The mobile is available for iOS and Android devices. The platform also operates multiple verified SINA Weibo accounts including @新浪体育(@SINASports), @新浪体育视频(@SINASportsVideo), and others, collectively garnering over 20 million Weibo followers.

== History ==
In 1998, Chinese Internet company SRSNet (四通利方) built and operated the official Chinese language online portal for the 1998 FIFA World Cup. Later that year, SRSNet acquired Hua Yuan Online and changed the name to Sina.com, and the sports platform became known as SINA Sports. SINA Sports has had the following milestones including:

- Official online website in China for FIFA 1998
- Official online partner in China for the 2000 Sydney Olympics
- Exclusive Internet partner for the Chinese soccer team for FIFA 2002
- Official Internet partner for the Athens 2004 Olympics
- Exclusive Internet partner in China for the 2008 Eurocup
- First to provide live-streaming feed for the 2010 World Cup in South Africa

== Programming ==
Live online broadcasting rights (Mainland China) as of November 2015:

=== European football ===
Sina Sports holds the live broadcasting rights for UEFA Champions League, AFC Champions League, Premier League, and Bundesliga matches.

=== Domestic football ===
Sina Sports holds the rights to broadcast Chinese Super League matches.

=== Tennis ===
Sina Sports broadcasts the WTA Zhuhai, the China Open, and the International Premier Tennis League. It is also a partner of the Australian Open.

=== Golf ===
Sina Sports holds the live broadcasting rights for the PGA Tour and the Masters.

=== Others ===
Other rights include MUTV, UFC, NFL, Dakar Rally, and the Royal Ascot.
