= CGNet Swara =

Indian online news reporting portal

- Founded: 2010
- Owner: Shubhranshu Choudhary
- Website: www.cgnetswara.org Expired

CGnet Swara is an Indian voice-based online portal that enables people in the forests of Chhattisgarh to report local news in Gondi by making a phone call. The portal is accessible both through mobile phones and online. Users can report stories and listen to them by giving a missed call. Reported stories are moderated by journalists and become available for playback online as well as over the phone. It was founded by journalist, Shubhranshu Choudhary. For this project, Choudhary won the Digital Activism Award in 2014 from the Index on Censorship beating Edward Snowden and China's Free Weibo.

== History ==
Choudhary was a journalist with the BBC World Service before he left to join the Knight International Journalism Fellowship. With the help of Microsoft Principal Researcher Bill Thies, he developed a cell phone based news and current affairs portal. He launched CGNet Swara with the support of Microsoft Research India in 2010. Choudhary trained people in the local community to produce audio news reports using their cell phone. The service was used to report on local issues such as land disputes, sanitation, health, crime, and human rights.

== How it works ==
Reporters recorded their news reports using an Interactive Voice Response (IVR) system. They recorded their message by calling a toll-free number. A group of professional journalists review and verify the news reports using a web interface. Once they are approved the stories are available for playback on the phone or on the CGNet Swara's website.

In 2014, with the advent of the low cost cell phones, an Android application was developed by Krittika D'Silva, then a student at the University of Washington. The application supported an interactive voice forum where users could record and play messages. The application also supported the ability to upload photos.
