= FaceKoo =

Chinese social networking service

- Company type: Private
- Website type: Social networking
- Available in: Simplified Chinese, Traditional Chinese
- Founded: China, March 2008
- Headquarters: Beijing, {{{location_country}}}
- Area served: Worldwide
- Founders: Calvin Pak, David Yan, Sheryl Liu
- Industry: Internet
- Website: http://www.facekoo.com/
- Advertising: Yes
- Launched: March 2008

Facekoo was a social networking service created and designed by Facekoo, which targets the Chinese language market. It offers a unique facial recognition system to connect each member to create a social circle. According to Alexa's ranking, its page views surpassed MySpace China in November 2008 and December 2008.

== Launch ==
Facekoo (simplified Chinese: 飞思酷; traditional Chinese: 飛思酷; pinyin: fēi'sī'kù) was a social networking platform created by a private proprietorship, the FaceKoo, Inc., which was based in Beijing, China. The FaceKoo name is derived from "face" and "koo" (a homonym for cool in Chinese). In the Chinese-language based market, this social networking platform targeted teenagers.

FaceKoo was created by co-founders Calvin Pak, CEO, David Yan, Chief technical officer, and Sheryl Liu, CMO, who are all Chinese Americans with extensive business track records in the Silicon Valley. FaceKoo offered numerous features, such as Mojing, a magic mirror that liked users to another FaceKoo member by facial analysis. Facial features could be chosen by users, so they could find their ideal "koo-friend". Online games and other interactive applications are also fascinating features available on FaceKoo.

FaceKoo rapidly grew since the initial launch in March 2008 in China. A Facebook sound alike website, FaceKoo, was considered as one of the major Chinese social networking site that can fit into the Eastern culture, said FaceKoo's founder. According to San Francisco Chronicle, FaceKoo had 350,000 users since its introduction in 2004.

== See also ==
- List of social networking websites
- Internet in China
- Renren
