= Weibo =

Chinese microblogging website

- Website type: Microblogging
- Available in: Simplified Chinese; Traditional Chinese; English (partial)
- Owner: Weibo Corporation
- Website: weibo.com
- Commercial: Yes
- Registration: Optional
- Launched: 14 August 2009; 17 years ago
- Current status: Active

Chinese name
- Chinese: 新浪微博
- Literal meaning: Sina Microblog
Transcriptions
Standard Mandarin
- Hanyu Pinyin: Xīnlàng Wēibó
- Bopomofo: ㄒㄧㄣ ㄌㄤˋ ㄨㄟ ㄅㄛˊ
- Gwoyeu Romatzyh: Shinlanq Ueibor
- Wade–Giles: Hsin^{1}-lang^{4} Wei^{1}-po^{2}
- Tongyong Pinyin: Sin-làng Wei-bó
- IPA: [ɕín.lâŋ wéɪ.pwǒ]
Yue: Cantonese
- Yale Romanization: Sānlohng Mèihbok
- Jyutping: san1 long6 mei4 bok3
- IPA: [sɐn˥ lɔŋ˨ mej˩ pɔk̚˧]

Weibo (Chinese: 微博; pinyin: Wēibó), or Sina Weibo (Chinese: 新浪微博; pinyin: Xīnlàng Wēibó), is a Chinese microblogging (weibo) website. Launched by Sina Corporation on 14 August 2009, it is one of the biggest social media platforms in China, with over 582 million monthly active users (252 million daily active users) as of Q1 2022. The platform has been highly successful but has faced criticism for heavy censorship.

Sina had gone public on the Nasdaq in 2000. In March 2014, Sina announced a spinoff of Weibo and filed an IPO under the symbol WB. Sina carved out 11% of Weibo in the IPO, with Alibaba owning 32% post-IPO. The company began trading publicly on 17 April 2014. In March 2017, Sina launched Sina Weibo International Version. In November 2018, Sina Weibo suspended its registration function for minors under the age of 14. In July 2019, Sina Weibo announced that it would launch a two-month campaign to clean up pornographic and vulgar information, named "Project Deep Blue" (蔚蓝计划). On 29 September 2020, the company announced it would go private again due to rising tensions between the US and China.

== Name ==
"Weibo" (微博) is the Chinese word for "microblog". Sina Weibo launched its new domain name weibo.com on 7 April 2011, deactivating and redirecting from the old domain, t.sina.com.cn, to the new one. Due to its popularity, the media sometimes refers to the platform simply as "Weibo", despite the numerous other Chinese microblogging services including Tencent Weibo, Sohu Weibo, and NetEase Weibo. However, the latter three have stopped providing services.

== Background ==
Sina Weibo is a platform based on fostering user relationships to share, disseminate, and receive information. Through the website or the mobile app, users can upload pictures and videos publicly for instant sharing, with other users being able to comment with text, pictures and videos, or use a multimedia instant messaging service. The company initially invited a large number of celebrities to join the platform at the beginning and has since invited many media personalities, government departments, businesses and non-governmental organizations to open accounts for the purpose of publishing and communicating information. To avoid the impersonation of celebrities, Sina Weibo uses verification symbols; celebrity accounts have an orange letter "V" and organizations' accounts have a blue letter "V". Sina Weibo has more than 500 million registered users; out of these, 313 million are monthly active users, 85% use the Weibo mobile app, 70% are college-aged, 50.10% are male and 49.90% are female. There are over 100 million messages posted by users each day. With more than 100 million followers, actress Xie Na holds the record for the most followers on the platform. Despite fierce competition among Chinese social media platforms, Sina Weibo remains the most popular.

== History ==
Sina Weibo gala in 2019. Participants include: Sun Yi, Chen Duling, Lin Junjie, Di Lieba, Li Yifeng, Huang Xiaoming, Guli Nazha, Zhou Dongyu, Hua Chenyu, Shawn Yue, Wang Jiaer, Zhu Yilong, Lin Chiling, Charmaine Sheh, Liu Ye, NINE PERCENT, and Wu Dajing.

After the July 2009 Ürümqi riots, China shut down most domestic microblogging services, including Fanfou, the very first weibo service. Many popular non-China-based microblogging services like Twitter, Facebook, and Plurk have since been blocked. Sina Corporation CEO Charles Chao considered this to be an opportunity, and on 14 August 2009, Sina launched the tested version of Sina Weibo. Basic functions including message, private message, comment and reposting were made available that September. A Sina Weibo–compatible API platform for developing third-party applications was launched on 28 July 2010.

On 1 December 2010, the website experienced an outage, which administrators later said was due to the ever-increasing numbers of users and posts. Registered users surpassed 100 million in February 2011. Since 23 March 2011, t.cn has been used as Sina Weibo's official shortened URL in lieu of sinaurl.cn. On 7 April 2011, weibo.com replaced t.sina.com.cn as the new main domain name used by the website. The official logo was also updated. In June 2011, Sina announced an English-language version of Sina Weibo would be developed and launched, though content would still be governed by Chinese law.

On 11 January 2013, Sina Weibo and Alibaba China (a subsidiary of Alibaba Group) signed a strategic cooperation agreement.

With more and more foreign celebrities using Sina Weibo, language translation has become an urgent need for Chinese users who wish to communicate with their idols online, especially Korean. In January 2013, Sina Weibo and NetEase.com announced that they had reached a strategic cooperation agreement. When users browse foreign language content, they can now directly obtain translation results through the YouDao Dictionary.

The Sina Weibo financial report in February 2013 showed that its total revenue was approximately US$66 million and that the number of registered users had exceeded the 500 million mark.

In April 2013, Sina officially announced that Sina Weibo had signed a strategic cooperation agreement with Alibaba. The two sides conducted in-depth cooperation in areas such as user account interoperability, data exchange, online payment, and internet marketing. At the same time, Sina announced that Alibaba, through its wholly owned subsidiary, had purchased the preferred shares and common shares issued by Sina Weibo Company for US$586 million, which accounted for approximately 18% of Weibo's fully diluted and diluted total shares.

=== Ownership ===
On 9 April 2013, Alibaba Group announced that it would acquire 18% of Sina Weibo for US$586 million, with the option to buy up to 30% in the future. Alibaba exercised this option when Weibo was listed on the NASDAQ in April 2014.

== Users ==
According to iResearch's report on 30 March 2011, Sina Weibo had 56.5% of China's microblogging market based on active users and 86.6% based on browsing time over competitors such as Tencent Weibo and Baidu. According to research by Sina Corporation, the number of active users reached over 400 million by Q1 2018, making Sina Weibo the 7th platform with at least 400 million active users, and daily usage increased by 21%.

As of 2017, approximately 80% of its users were in their 20s and 30s.

The top 100 users had over 485 million followers combined. More than 5,000 companies and 2,700 media organizations in China use Sina Weibo. The site is maintained by a growing microblogging department of 200 employees responsible for technology, design, operations, and marketing. Sina executives invited and persuaded many Chinese celebrities to join the platform. Users now include Asian celebrities, movie stars, singers, famous business and media figures, athletes, scholars, artists, organizations, religious figures, government departments, and officials from Hong Kong, Mainland China, Malaysia, Singapore, Taiwan, and Macau, as well as some famous foreign individuals and organizations, including Kevin Rudd, Boris Johnson, David Cameron, Narendra Modi, Toshiba, and the Germany national football team. Sina Weibo has a verification program for known people and organizations. Once an account is verified, a verification badge is added beside the account name.

== Features ==
Many of Sina Weibo's features resemble those of Twitter. A user may post with a 140-character limit (increased to 2,000 as of January 2016 with the exception of reposts and comments). An analysis of 29 million Weibo posts found the median length was 14 characters. Users may mention or talk to other people using "@UserName" formatting, add hashtags, follow other users to make their posts appear in one's own timeline, re-post with "//@UserName" similar to Twitter's retweet function "RT @UserName", select posts for one's favorites list, and verify the account if the user is a celebrity, brand, business or otherwise of public interest. URLs are automatically shortened using the domain name t.cn, akin to Twitter's t.co. Official and third-party applications can access Sina Weibo from other websites or platforms.

Users may:

- Submit up to 18 images/video files in every post
- Send personal messages to followers
- Follow others and be followed
- Post "stories" like on Instagram
- React to posts using different emojis
- Receive monetary rewards that can be used in a digital store linked to Weibo
- View posts identified as "hot" or popular
- Display the location they post from

Hashtags differ slightly between Sina Weibo and Twitter, using the double-hashtag "#HashName#" format (the lack of spacing between Chinese characters necessitates a closing tag). Users can own a hashtag by requesting hashtag monitoring; the company reviews these requests and responds within one to three days. Once a user owns a hashtag, they have access to a wide variety of functions available only to them on the condition that they remain active (less than 1 post per calendar week revokes these privileges).

Additionally, comments appear as a list below each post. A commenter can also choose to re-post the comment, quoting the whole original post, to their own page.

Unregistered users can only browse a few posts by verified accounts. Neither unverified account pages nor comments to posts by verified accounts are accessible to unregistered users.

Although often described as a Chinese version of Twitter, Sina Weibo combines elements of Twitter, Facebook, and Medium, along with other social media platforms. Sina Weibo users interact more than Twitter users do, and while many topics that go viral on Weibo also originate from the platform itself, Twitter topics often come from outside news or events.

During the outbreak of the COVID-19, Weibo was also a data collecting station to collect and detect the spread of the coronavirus.

Trending topics

Sina Weibo's "trending topics" is a list of current popular topics based partly on tracking user participation and partly on the preference of Weibo staff. Once a topic is trending, it often becomes a heated issue and can have wide-ranging social influence. As such, the list has reshaped how Chinese people relate to the news media.

=== Verification ===
Sina Weibo has a verification policy for confirming the identity of a user (celebrities, organizations etc.). Once a user is verified, a colorful V is appended to their username; individuals receive an orange V, while organizations and companies receive a blue V. A graph and declaration certifying the verification appear on verified user pages. There are several kinds of verifications: personal, college, organization, verification for official accounts (government departments, social media platforms and famous companies), and Weibo Master (linked with phone numbers and followers).

To protect the rights and interests of celebrities, Sina Weibo has launched a celebrity authentication system. The celebrity authentication logo is a gold "V" logo after the verified user's name. The certified figures are mainly stars of various industries, business executives and important news parties. From 22:00 on June 12, 2020, users who post comments must follow the blogger for more than 7 days, except for those who have set "people I follow" to comment on themselves. This adjustment will last for 7 days.

=== Fan groups ===
In 2014, Weibo introduced "fan groups", a function that allows blogger accounts to manage follower communities and interact directly with fans in the group. Celebrities with more than 10,000 followers and related administrator accounts are eligible to create fan groups. These owners have various administrative powers, including the ability to moderate contents, membership, and to dissolve the association between the main accounts and the fan group or dissolve the fan group itself.

Fan groups have a higher member limit compared to regular groups. Group members can advance their status through the frequency of their posting or participation (often described as "clocking in").

=== Clients ===
Sina produces mobile applications for various platforms to access Sina Weibo, including Android, BlackBerry OS, iOS, Symbian S60, Windows Mobile, Windows Phone and HarmonyOS. Sina has also released a desktop client for Microsoft Windows under the product name Weibo Desktop.

=== International versions ===
Sina Weibo is available in both simplified and traditional Chinese characters. The site also has versions that cater to users from Hong Kong and Taiwan. In 2011, Weibo developed an international edition in English and other languages. On 9 January 2018, the company ran a week-long public test of its English edition.

Sina Weibo's official iPhone and iPad apps are available in English.

Weibo International supports existing Weibo accounts and allows Facebook accounts to link to the platform; users can also use their mobile phone number (including international mobile phone numbers) to register new accounts.

=== Weibo Stories ===
One of the most recent features of Weibo is Stories. "Weibo's stories" is a video function allowing users to record a video and save them in a separate "Story" menu in their profile page.

=== Weibo VLOG ===
Weibo has also launched a new "Vlog" function. Now, every video with a hashtag VLOG will be available in the main search page under "VLOG" sub-menu.

=== Weibo interviews ===
Weibo interviews are text-based interviews hosted on the Weibo platform. Users post questions to the person being interviewed via Weibo posts and that person responds in real-time.

=== Posting via text message ===
If a user links their Weibo account to a cell phone number, the user can both make and receive Weibo posts via text message. The user can then upload posts by texting them to 1069 009 009 and they will appear on Weibo in real time. Replies or comments to those posts are sent to the user via text message.

=== IP address ===
Weibo began displaying IP addresses of users when posting and commenting in April 2022.

=== Super-hashtags ===
Between 2014 and 2016, the growth in interest-driven and subcultural communities among Weibo users prompted the development of Weibo's super-hashtag function. The super-hashtag function seeks to aggregate high-quality content associated with specific hashtags for users interested in these topics.

Each super-hashtag can have up to three major hosts and ten minor hosts. Hosts can regulate the super-hashtag by blocking posts and users. Major hosts can label posts as "recommended" which increases visibility in a "stickied"/highlight zone at the top of the super-hashtag page.

=== Other services ===
Weilingdi (微领地, literally, micro fief) is another service bundled with Weibo. Similar to Foursquare, Weilingdi is a location-based social networking website for mobile devices; the site grew out of Sina's 2011 joint venture with GeoSentric's GyPSii. Sina's Tuding (图钉) photo-sharing service, similar to Instagram, is also produced by the same joint venture. Sina Lady Weibo (新浪女性微博) specializes in women's interests. Weibo Data Center enables users to access data analysis about a topic of their choice, Sina Weibo's official data, and demographic information. Sina Weibo has also recently released a desktop version available for free download at its website.

== Issues ==
=== Racism ===
On 2 May 2021, a Weibo account belonging to the Chinese Communist Party's Central Political and Legal Affairs Commission posted an image of rocket Long March 5B's launch next to a photo of mass cremations of the dead in India as a result of the COVID-19 pandemic with the caption "China lighting a fire versus India lighting a fire". The post was quickly deleted after it faced massive backlash from users and a hashtag related to the post also was deleted.

According to a report by the Human Rights Watch, racist content targeting black people is strongly prevalent in Chinese social media platforms including Weibo.

=== Regulation in China ===
In cooperation with internet censorship in China, Sina sets strict controls over the posts on its services. Posts with links using some URL shortening services (including Google's goo.gl), or containing blacklisted keywords, are not allowed on Sina Weibo. Posts on politically sensitive topics are deleted after manual checking. Users with few followers may be able to post on censored topics with relative freedom until they reach a critical mass of followers, which triggers enforced content supervision.

Sina Weibo is believed to employ a distributed, heterogeneous strategy for censorship that has a great amount of defense-in-depth, which ranges from keyword list filtering to individual user monitoring. Nearly 30% of the total deletion events occur within 5–30 minutes, and nearly 90% of the deletions happen within the first 24 hours.

On 9 March 2010, the posts by Chinese artist and activist Ai Weiwei at Sina Weibo to appeal for information on the 2008 Sichuan earthquake going public were deleted and his account was closed by the site administrator. Attempts to register accounts with usernames alluding to Ai Weiwei were blocked. On 30 March 2010, Hong Kong singer Gigi Leung blogged about the jailed Zhao Lianhai, an activist and father to a 2008 Chinese milk scandal victim; that post was also deleted by an administrator shortly thereafter.

On 16 March 2012, all users of Sina Weibo in Beijing were told to register with their real names.

Starting on 31 March 2012, the comment function of Sina Weibo was shut down for three days, along with Tencent QQ.

In May 2012, Sina Weibo introduced new restrictions on the content its users can post.

In October 2012, Sina Weibo heavily censored discussion of the Foxconn strikes in October 2012.

On 4 June 2013, Sina Weibo blocked the terms "Today", "Tonight", "June 4", and "Big Yellow Duck". If a user searched using these terms, a message would appear stating that according to relevant laws, statutes and policies, the results of the search couldn't be shown. This censorship was implemented because a photoshopped version of Tank Man which swapped all tanks in the photo with the sculpture Rubber Duck had been circulating on Twitter.

On 8 September 2017, Weibo gave an ultimatum to its users to verify their accounts with their real names by 15 September. The platform announced that same month that it would hire 1000 "supervisors" from among its users to engage in censorship. These supervisors were supposed to report at least 200 content pieces per month, with those with the best results being rewarded with special prizes, including iPhones and notebooks.

On 18 February 2018, Sina Weibo provided a "Comment moderation" function for both head users and official members. Comments received after opening this feature will not be displayed immediately, instead of requiring approval from moderators. Users can utilize this feature to avoid illegal content appearing in their comment section.

In April 2018, Weibo began a crackdown on anime, games, and short videos depicting "pornography, gore, violence and homosexuality". The CCP criticized Weibo's move, following which the company decided to exclude homosexual content from the purge.

On 11 June 2020, the Cybersecurity Administration of China ordered Weibo to suspend its "trending topics" page for a week. The CAC accused Weibo of "dissemination of illegal information".

On 22 February 2022, Horizon News accidentally posted on its Weibo page its instructions not to post anti-Russia content related to the crisis between Russia and Ukraine.

In January 2023, Sina Weibo suspended more than 1,000 social media accounts of critics of the Chinese government response to COVID-19.

=== Censorship in India ===
In June 2020, Weibo was among 58 other Chinese apps that were banned by the Government of India. Following this, Prime Minister of India Narendra Modi's account was deactivated.

=== Fake social media engagement ===
Chinese social media has strong influencer and celebrity fandom cultures. Celebrities and digital influencers, or key opinion leaders (KOLs), compete for higher follower counts to attract brand deals. Despite some efforts undertaken by Weibo to curb fake engagement, the issue remains pervasive due to the incentives for influencers and the advanced nature of fake engagement tools.

In 2018, a government crackdown exposed widespread manipulation on Sina Weibo, resulting in the temporary banning of numerous celebrities from its rankings. Notable figures like Wang Sicong were removed from the "hot searches" list, revealing a black market for manipulating rankings. Celebrities and KOLs exploit these tactics to enhance their visibility and suppress unfavorable stories. Weibo acknowledged this problem, listing banned terms and promising increased efforts to manage illegal content. Despite these measures, services offering to boost hashtags into top trending topics for a fee remain prevalent.

Weibo is also inundated with fake followers, with 10,000 zombie followers costing around 10 yuan according to a 2019 Caixin report. Celebrity fan clubs act as comprehensive fake social media traffic generators, employing dedicated teams to create content and boost engagement figures. Reports indicate that a significant portion of top influencers have used these services to meet the minimum follower requirements for attracting advertisers.

== Promotions ==
=== Weibo paid ads ===
Average organic post view is around 10–15% on Weibo. To attract more followers, there are three types of paid ads options available:

- Sponsored Post: Promotes to current followers and/or potential followers.
- Weibo Tasks: Allows advertisers to pay for other accounts to repost, which in turn reach target audiences.
- Fensi Tong (粉丝通): The most well known paid advertising option on Weibo; allows more specific targeting options, including interests, gender, location and devices. Advertisers can choose between CPM (cost per million; CNY 0.5 per thousand exposure) and CPC (cost per engagement; CNY 0.5 per effective engagement). Companies or organizations often use Fensitong and pay well-known Sina Weibo users (usually those with more than one million followers) to advertise to their followers.

=== Livery airplane ===
On 8 June 2011, Tianjin Airlines unveiled an Embraer E-190 jet in special Sina Weibo livery and named it "Sina Weibo plane" (新浪微博号). It is the first commercial airplane to be named after a website in China.

=== Villarreal CF ===
In January 2012, Sina Weibo also announced that they would be sponsoring Spanish football club Villarreal CF for its match against FC Barcelona, to increase its fanbase in China.

=== CCTV 2018 New Year's Gala ===
On 5 February 2018, Weibo officially announced that it will become the exclusive partner of the New Media Social Platform of the CCTV Spring Festival Gala in 2018 to attract more Chinese people worldwide to use Weibo.

== Statistics ==
=== Sina Weibo's official accounts ===
1. Weibo's Secretary: 194,144,293
2. Weibo's Service Center: 180,564,151
3. Weibo's Staff: 155,444,287

=== Most popular accounts (individuals) ===
As of 27 October 2027, the following ten individuals managed the most popular accounts (name handle in parentheses) and the number of followers:

Rank	Username	Owner	Followers (millions)	Region
1	@xiena	Xie Na	126	China
2	@1195230310	He Jiong	117	China
3	@yangmi	Yang Mi	113	China
4	@angelababy	Angelababy	107	China
5	@chenkun	Chen Kun	92.65	China
6	@1259110474	Zhao Liying	92.19	China
7	@3623353053	Jackson Yee	90.23	China
8	@TFBOYS-wangyuan	Wang Yuan	85.39	China
9	@2609400635	Roy Wang	84.09	China
10	@1656809190	Vicky Zhao	83.54	China
As of 27 October 2026

=== Record-setting posts ===
On 13 September 2013, the unverified handle "veggieg" (widely believed to be Faye Wong) posted a message suggesting that she had divorced her husband. The message was commented and re-posted more than a million times in four hours. The record was broken on 31 March 2014 by Wen Zhang, who posted a long apology admitting an extramarital affair when his wife Ma Yili was pregnant with their second child. This message was commented and re-posted more than 2.5 million times in 10 hours. (Ma's response generated 2.18 million responses in 12 hours.) On 22 June 2014, TFBOYS member Wang Junkai was awarded a Guinness World Record title for a Weibo post that was reposted 42,776,438 times. Luhan holds the Guinness World Record for most comments.

== See also ==
- FreeWeibo – the uncensored and anonymous version of Sina Weibo, operated by an unaffiliated third party
- List of social networking services
- Tencent Weibo
