= Oak Pacific Interactive =

Beijing-based Chinese holding company

Oak Pacific Interactive (Chinese: 千橡互动集团), established in 2002, is a Beijing-based Chinese holding company.

Oak Pacific Interactive is the second-largest operator of social networking websites in China, after taking ownership of one of the most viewed Web sites in China MOP.com, information technology portal Donews and social networking site Xiaonei.

In April 2008, Oak Pacific Interactive raised US$430 million from an investment group led by Japanese telecom company Softbank in exchange for a 35 percent stake.
