= Wang Yuan =

Wang Yuan or Yuan Wang may refer to:

- Wang Yuan (painter), Chinese landscape painter during the Yuan dynasty
- Wang Yuan (mathematician) (1930–2021), Chinese mathematician, academician of the Chinese Academy of Sciences
- Wang Yuan (palaeontologist), Chinese palaeontologist
- Wang Yuan (athlete) (born 1976), 1993 World Junior record setter at 800 metres and 1500 metres
- Yuan Wang (control theorist) (Chinese: 王沅), Chinese-American mathematician specializing in control theory
- Roy Wang (born 2000), also known as Wang Yuan, Chinese artist

== See also ==
- Yuan Wang-class tracking ship
