= Weibo Corporation =

Chinese social network company

Weibo Corporation 北京微梦创科网络技术有限公司
- Type: Public
- Traded as: Nasdaq: WB; SEHK: 9898
- Industry: Internet
- Founded: August 9, 2010
- Headquarters: Beijing, China
- Key people: Liu Yunli (刘运利) (Chairman & CEO)
- Products: Social network
- Parent: Sina Corporation

Weibo Corporation is a Chinese social network company known for the microblogging website Sina Weibo. It is based in Beijing, China.

== History ==
Weibo was established by Sina Corporation as T.CN, but it changed its name to Weibo in 2012.

== Business ==
Advertising and marketing account for most of Weibo's revenue. In 2025, the company reported net revenues of US$1.76 billion, flat compared with 2024, of which US$1.50 billion came from advertising and marketing and US$255.6 million from value-added services. Net income attributable to shareholders was US$449.0 million. In December 2025, Weibo had 567 million monthly active users and 252 million average daily active users.

== See also ==
- Internet technology companies of China
- Microblogging in China
- Sina Weibo
