= Pengyou =

Social network

- Website type: Social networking
- Available in: Chinese language
- Headquarters: Shenzhen, Guangdong
- Area served: Worldwide
- Owner: Tencent
- Industry: Social networking service
- Website: www.pengyou.com
- Advertising: Banner ads, referral marketing
- Registration: Required
- Launched: August 2008
- Current status: Inactive

Pengyou (Chinese: 朋友; pinyin: péngyǒu; lit. 'Friend'), formerly QQ Xiaoyou (Chinese: QQ校友; lit. 'QQ Alumni'), was a social network operated by Tencent.

Pengyou was founded in August 2008 as a competitor to Renren. The site used real names and photos were synced with Qzone.

The site has both a social area but also a section for corporate outreach, where friends can become 'fans' of various companies, and companies can use the site to engage with their consumers.

Pengyou was shut down on 6 August 2017. Pengyou was briefly revived as an app on December 2019, but ceased operations on 30 June 2021.
