= Fanfou =

Microblogging website

- Website type: Microblogging
- Available in: Simplified Chinese; Traditional Chinese
- Website: fanfou.com
- Commercial: Yes
- Launched: 12 May 2007
- Current status: Active

Fanfou (simplified Chinese: 饭否; traditional Chinese: 飯否; pinyin: Fànfǒu) is a Chinese microblogging (weibo) website. It was the first microblogging site in China.

== History ==
Fanfou.com was founded by Wang Xing with the team that created Xiaonei on 12 May 2007. The website was developed in LAMP stack with Twitter-compatible APIs.

Hewlett-Packard became its first paid customer on June 2, 2009.

It was closed on 7 July 2009 due to censorship in the wake of July 2009 Ürümqi riots. It was reopened on 11 November 2010.
