= Referral marketing =

Type of marketing

Referral marketing is a word-of-mouth initiative designed by a company to incentivize existing customers to introduce their family, friends, and contacts to become new customers. Unlike pure word-of-mouth strategies—where customers independently share information without company involvement or ability to track—referral marketing actively incentivizes and rewards existing customers for referring new ones, allowing the company to influence, track, and measure the referral process.

The process is distinct from multi-level marketing, in that there is no incentive for the original existing customer to drive or influence the subsequent referrals of the new customer – only the conversion of the initial, primary customer is rewarded.

== Overview ==
Referral marketing is a tool used by businesses and corporations across various industries to grow and build their customer bases. In the past, referral marketing was purely focused on spreading information through verbal interaction with a close network. Modern-day referral marketing now heavily relies on social media and the internet, allowing the scope of referrals to increase dramatically by reaching a far broader audience.

There are three fundamental elements that help define and differentiate referral programs from organic WOM (word of mouth). They are company driven in that they are actively managed by the parent company, which is different from organic WOM which involves the unprompted recommendation for a company's products or services through external interaction, free from company influence. Secondly, an overarching aim is to convert existing customer's networks to join as new customers. Lastly, is a reward or incentive given to the existing customer by the company for the successful conversion of their network to their products and/or services.

Referral programs typically fall into two categories: incentive-based and non-incentive-based. The former is much more common and includes rewards such as cash, prizes, discounts, shopping vouchers or the service itself for a limited time. For example, telecommunication companies may offer discounts or vouchers to customers and credit card companies may offer redeemable points, coupons or cash for a new service. The latter referral marketing program benefits the existing customer through increasing reputation and gaining special treatment from the parent company through working without economic payment on presentations and online forums for example .

Referral marketing was questioned by managers for the effectiveness and material benefit it could bring to a company in comparison to organic WOM and other means. Concerns over operating costs of implementing a referral program, unsustainable economic benefits, suspicion on the trustworthiness of the referee given the monetary incentive to recommend, as well as abuse from opportunistic referrers all questioned the value of referral marketing brings to a company.

== Online referral marketing ==
Online referral marketing is the internet-based, or Software as a Service (SaaS) approach, to traditional referral marketing. By tracking customer behavior online through the use of web browser cookies and similar technology, online referral marketing can potentially increase brand awareness, referrals and, ultimately, revenue. Many platforms allow organizations to see their referral marketing return on investment (ROI), and to optimize their campaigns to improve results. Many of the newest systems provide users with the same experience whether they are on a desktop or mobile device. Offline referral marketers sometimes use trackable business cards. Trackable business cards typically contain QR codes linking them to online content for sale while providing a way to track that sale back to the person whose card was scanned.

Online referral marketing focuses on interactions between customers. The Internet is a common channel for referral-based marketing. It delivers abundant outlets for customers to share their opinions, product favourites, and experiences, including the company's website and through social media. The marketers can encourage the referring parties by providing pre-scripted messages. Advocates can provide their family members and friends with personalised links including unique referral codes and advertisement information through e-mails, blogs and instant messages. The company can give rewards to advocates when their family members and friends buy through the link.

These same technologies also help companies set up a system that integrates referrals into the marketing plan. By tracking user traffic, the companies can offer referrals to other online customers.

== Advantages ==
There are multiple advantages to referral programs. Typically, referral customers are better matched due to the existing customer knowing both parties and able to determine the benefits to the potential new customer; given the product or service is useful to the referrer, the prospect has a higher chance of also finding it useful. This brings higher value customers to the company or authority at a lower cost.

With a referral from a close tie, there are implications on the referrer's reputation if the product or service is not well-received, given the higher value placed on a personal recommendation rather than an advertisement. Thus, it is in the referrer's best interest to recommend a product or service that is not only useful to the potential prospect but also something that they themselves have used.

Literature has determined that the customer value and contribution derived from referral programs are higher for a firm than those sourced from other means.

They can also serve as a tool to measure the health of customer satisfaction. High-performing referral programs or a high magnitude of referrers may indicate high customer satisfaction and vice versa.

Referral programs can help establish long-term relations with customers by matching customer motivations and expectations with referring new customers. This way, referral programs can also be regarded as a tool for retaining existing customers.

== Disadvantages ==
The referrer may not be impartial if compensation is based on the prospect joining the customer, not just for the referral. Incentives can place an ulterior motive on the referrer's end, which can introduce a drive to 'sell' referrals in order to receive compensation. This can result in uncertainty from the referred customer, and reduce trust in both the existing customer and company regardless of the product or service sold. This does not happen with pure WOM given that there are no incentives given to referrers by a company to recommend.

A large majority of referral marketing programs will compensate regardless of the longevity or quality of the new customer; this creates a moral hazard favoring opportunists and potentially harms the genuineness of the recommendations. Referrers can spread referrals to a wide audience, either offline or online, and introduce low quality customers to the business with no consequence. However, this abuse is offset by the benefits of the referral marketing program and companies should still consider the implementation. Depending on the size of the reward, referrers may also knowingly recommend to their network a poor service or product.

Referral programs are not free and have operational costs to acquire new customers. Administrative costs, software with databases to recognize and trace purchasers, advertisement campaigns and incentive costs are just some of these.

It does require additional time and resources to set up and manage on a day to day basis.

== Effectiveness of referral marketing ==
A study in 2010 by the University of Pennsylvania and Goethe University Frankfurt aimed to determine the relationship between the value a customer brings to a business through online referral marketing versus other methods by answering four questions:

- "Are referred customers more valuable?"
- "Is the difference in customer value large enough to cover the costs of such stimulated WOM customer acquisition efforts?"
- "Are customers acquired through a referral program more valuable because they generate higher margins, exhibit higher retention, or both?"
- "Do differences in margins and retention remain stable or do they erode?"

This study followed the online referral program of a bank in Germany and saw that each referral by an existing customer would result in a 25 euro reward. The results determined that referred customers were both more profitable and loyal than normal customers. Referred customers had a higher contribution margin, a higher retention rate and were more valuable overall in both the short and long term – 16% more in profits and 25% more valuable. A referred customer had an 82% chance of being an active customer after 33 months in comparison to 79.2%. However, it was found that the program was less effective in referring individuals over the age of 55 or low-margin customers.

The study suggested that while there are disadvantages associated with referral marketing, the overall benefits may outweigh these drawbacks, indicating that referral programs can be effective for customer base growth. It also noted that referral programs can better target high value customers who are more likely to retain the service provided, at a lower cost than conventional marketing means. In terms of the referrer, they found that firms should make the reward a function of the value of the existing customer instead of following their own competitors.

== Referral marketing reward structure ==
A study in 2019 by Harvard Business School, Washington University in St. Louis and University of California, San Diego aimed to find the highest converting reward structure for referral marketing.

The study examines five incentive structures:

- No-incentive (control)
- Sender-benefiting
- Recipient-benefiting
- Shared
- Donations

The study found that recipient-benefiting incentive structures convert 1.41 - 1.79 times more than sender-benefiting structures. Additionally shared incentive structures converted at similar rates of recipient-benefiting structures. No-incentive and donation structures converted at substantially lower levels than all other options.

=== Double vs single sided rewards ===
There are two main types of referral programs: A single-sided referral program and a double-sided referral program.

A single-sided referral program is one that only offers a referral bonus or reward to the person who is making the referral. Usually, this person would be an existing customer or the referrer

Whereas a double-sided referral program offers a referral reward to the person making the referrals as well as a referral incentive to the friend, colleague, or family member that has been referred. Also known as the referee or the person invited.

Double-sided referral programs are generally more successful than single sided ones. This is because customers feel much more comfortable making referrals when they know that the person they are referring will also benefit in some way. This does not always have to be a cash incentive, it could be an upgrade to a business, a free gift, or access to exclusive content.

Additionally, if a friend or family member receives a discount or incentive of sorts, it increases the likelihood that they will choose one business over another.

== See also ==
- Customer knowledge
- Content marketing
- Affiliate marketing
