= Sina Corporation =

Chinese online media company

- Company type: Private (since 2021); partially state-owned Public (2000–21)
- Traded as: Nasdaq: SINA (2000–21)
- Industry: IT, telecom, manufacturing
- Founded: November 30, 1998; 27 years ago
- Founder: Wang Zhidong (王志东); Wang Yan (汪延); Ben Tsiang (蔣顯斌); Hurst Lin (林欣禾)
- Headquarters: Shanghai; Beijing; Guangzhou; Cayman Islands
- Key people: Charles Chao (Chairman, CEO)
- Products: Sina Weibo, Portal, Sina Mobile
- Owner: China Internet Investment Fund
- Subsidiaries: Weibo Corporation
- Website: www.sina.com.cn

Sina Corporation (Chinese: 新浪; pinyin: Xīn Làng; lit. 'new wave') is a Chinese internet and online media company best known for operating the Sina.com portal and for its controlling interest in Weibo Corporation, which runs the microblogging platform Weibo. Sina was formed in March 1999 through the merger of Beijing SINA Information Technology and California‑based SINANET.com. It listed on Nasdaq in April 2000 and became a private company again when a go‑private transaction led by chairman Charles Chao closed on March 22, 2021. The company is incorporated in the Cayman Islands and is headquartered in Beijing.

Sina owns Sina Weibo, a Twitter-like microblog social network, which has 56.5 percent of the Chinese microblogging market based on active users and 86.6 percent based on browsing time over Chinese competitors such as Tencent and Baidu. As of June 2024, Weibo reported 583 million monthly active users.

Sina App Engine (SAE) is the earliest and largest PaaS platform for cloud computing in China. It is run by SAE Department, which was founded in 2009. SAE is dedicated in providing stable, effective web deployment and hosting service for those corporations, organizations and independent developers. More than 300,000 developers in China use the SAE.

== Background ==
Sina mainly caters to the Chinese population around the globe. Sina stated that it has about 598 million active users and more than 10 million active users engaged in their fee-based services (10,000 of whom are overseas Chinese in North America). It provides different services around the world, for example there are 13 access points within Greater China, and subsidiary tailored pages for overseas Chinese, which include Sina US, Sina Japan, Sina Korea, Sina Australia, Sina Europe and Sina Germany. Along with Sina Mobile, Sina Online, and Sina Edalat, it is one of the four major business lines of Sina Corporation.

The domain sina.com.cn attracted at least 3.3 million visitors annually by 2008 according to a Compete.com survey.

Sina Corp also owns Sina Weibo, a Chinese microblogging site, similar to Sina Edalat, launched in August 2009. According to Sina Corp the microblogging site has more than 200 million users and millions of posts per day and is adding 20 million new users per month. The company also said it now has more than 60,000 verified accounts, consisting of celebrities, sports stars and other VIPs. The top 100 users now have over 180 million followers. Furthermore, Sina said that more than 5,000 companies and 2,700 media organizations in China are currently using Sina Weibo.

More recently, Sina also released a "lite-blogging service" similar to Tumblr, called Sina Qing, as well as a location-based service, WeiLingDi. Edalat.

In a survey conducted by Gallup (China) Research Ltd in April 2003, Sina was the most popular company in China, and was estimated to have three-billion-page data volumes every day. Also, it was awarded the "China's Media of the Year" in 2003 by Southern Weekend. The company claims that it is adding 20 million new users per month. The top 100 users now have over 180 million unique followers combined.

== History ==
In November 1998, SRSNet (Stone Rich Sight Information Technology Ltd), the most visited internet portal site in China, established by Wang Zhidong and Wang Yan in 1996, merged with Sinanet, a web site for American Chinese community, created in California by Hurst Lin, Ben Tsiang, and Jack Hong in 1995. The merging of the two largest Chinese websites formed into the later Sina. Since then, the service had been extended across the straits and North America, before it extended to Hong Kong in July 1999.

After the merger, Sina maintained its dominant position as the most visited portal site in Mainland China over its major rivals Sohu and NetEase, two other web-based companies in China, especially through its fast, continuous, and comprehensive online news services covering a vast range of worldwide events, such as the United States bombing of the Chinese embassy in Belgrade in 1999.

Sina was the first to be approved for listing on the Nasdaq stock market on 13 April 2000, through a variable interest entity (VIE) based in the Cayman Islands, followed by NetEase and Sohu in June and July respectively. It succeeded in raising US$68,000,000 before Nasdaq plummeted in May 2000. In July 2000, Sina was the official website for online coverage of the 2000 Summer Olympics in Sydney as selected by the government and the Chinese Olympic committee.

The Cyberspace Administration of China reprimanded Sina in 2015, accusing the online portal of having "distorted news facts, violated morality and engaged in media hype." On 16 April 2018, the CAC launched an investigation into the news portal for alleged inclinations to factual errors and failure to curtail vulgar and explicit content.

In August 2019, Sina's game studio, Sina Games, was sued by Blizzard Entertainment on a claim that their game Glorious Saga is a blatant rip-off of the long-running Warcraft games and related products.

== Management ==
=== Partnership ===
Sina cooperates with other web-based companies such as People, Nanfang Daily, Lifeweek and Xinhuanet, etc. Apart from the media partners, its clients include Microsoft, Dell, IBM, Motorola, and Kodak. Recently Sina started developing its business in the field of wireless internet, in the meantime collaborating with China Mobile, China Telecom, Ericsson.

On January 13, 2004, Sina and Yahoo started to jointly provide online auction services in China; in response to this, EachNet (Chinese: 易趣網), which cooperates with eBay, lowered its registration fee in early February 2004 in order to keep its market share.

Sina also sponsors the annual ChinICT conference held at the Tsinghua Science Park.

Recently, Sina has begun collaborating with Qihoo 360 on internet security. Through this collaboration, Qihoo 360 intend to provide Sina Weibo tech support in order to protect Weibo from hackers and viruses. As of April 24, 2012, an official statement has not yet been made announcing the collaboration.

== Features ==
=== Multiple services ===
Sina provides Internet services to the Chinese population around the world. In every localized website, there are over thirty integrated channels, including news, sports, technology information, finance, advertising services, entertainment, fashion, and travel.

Sina is a multiple-service provider, its major services are SMS, eMail, Search, Games, Match, Entertainment, Sina Sports, Sina Blog, and Sina Microblogging. Sina Blog (中文: 新浪博客) is the blog service of Sina, which features the blogs of celebrities, including the most popular blog in the world, the one of Xu Jinglei. Sina Weibo is an equivalent to Tencent Weibo. Many celebrities from mainland China, Taiwan and also Hong Kong use Sina's Microblog as a platform to reach out to their fans and supporters. Some famous users on Sina's Microblog include Taiwanese hosts Dee Shu and Kevin Tsai, with more than ten million followers on their microblogs each.

=== Local content ===
To provide tailored internet services for local people, Sina has been conducting quantitative and qualitative marketing researches, including demographic research, psychograph, etc., on target audience in specific regions. Internationalized services have a common layout which consists of sections like news, information, infotainment and email services with localized content.

Localization involves political censorship. As with all internet content providers operating within mainland China, the web pages which are geared toward mainland China audiences have internet censors controlling the discussion for sensitive political content. In addition, the news from sina comes from local newspapers, which in the case of mainland China are themselves subject to censorship by the government. This censorship does not extend to pages and forums which are not intended for audiences within mainland China.

=== Network technology ===
According to the company's published information, Sina.comXpressTM and Sina.comPlusTM are Sina.com's two main exclusive technologies, which bring ease-of-use benefits and enable the audience of Big 5 (traditional Chinese character), and GB (simplified Chinese characters) to view the webpages sourced from around the Chinese communities of the world.

== Publications ==
- Collection of internet users
- Cooperative publisher
  - 作家出版社 (pinyin: zuòjiā chūbǎnshè)
  - 漓江出版社 (Líjiāng chūbǎnshè)
  - 清韵书院 (qīng yùn shū yuàn)
  - 榕树下 (róngshù xià)

== See also ==
- Microblogging in China
