= Charles Chao =

Chairman of the board of directors of Weibo Corporation

Charles Guowei Chao 曹国伟
- Born: 1965 (age 60–61); Shanghai, China
- Education: B.A. in Journalism from Fudan University; M.A. in Journalism from The University of Oklahoma; MPA from The University of Texas at Austin
- Occupations: CEO and President of Sina Corporation

Charles Chao or Guowei Chao (Chinese: 曹国伟; pinyin: Cáo Guówěi) has served as the chairman of the board of directors since the inception of Weibo Corporation. He has served as the chairman of the board of directors of Weibo's parent company, Sina, since August 2012, and has been Sina's Chief Executive Officer since May 2006. He served as Sina's president from September 2005 to February 2013, Chief Financial Officer from February 2001 to May 2006, and Co-Chief Operating Officer from July 2004 to September 2005. He also served as Sina's Executive Vice President from April 2002 to June 2003 and Vice President, Finance from September 1999 to January 2001.

== Education ==
Chao holds a B.A. in journalism from Fudan University in Shanghai, an M.A. in journalism from the University of Oklahoma, and a Master's in Professional Accounting from the McCombs School of Business at The University of Texas at Austin.

== Career ==
Chao joined Sina in 1999 when the company was facing difficulties in its attempts to get a listing on the NASDAQ. He overcame this challenge by establishing Sina as a VIE (Variable Interest Entity) company, which cleared the way for a successful listing in the US.

Since then, he has served as Sina's Chief Financial Officer (CFO), Chief Operating Officer (COO) and President in September 2005, and finally chairman of the board and CEO in 2011. He is the first chairman and CEO in company's history. In 2009, he helped launch Sina Weibo, which has gone on to achieve great success.

Chao has also made use of the company's platform to support public welfare undertakings in China. Currently, Sina is one of the largest venues for making donations and emergency fundraising and is one of the first internet companies to set up a charity and public welfare platform. Now, Sina has established Yang Fan Public Welfare Fund, which will enable the company to participate more effectively in charity and public welfare causes.

== Work history and other roles ==
Prior to joining Sina, Chao served as an audit manager at PricewaterhouseCoopers, LLP, an accounting firm. Prior to that, Chao was a news correspondent at Shanghai Media Group. Chao is currently the Chairman of Weibo Corporation, a leading media company, Co-chairman of E-House, a real estate services company, and a director of NetDragon Websoft Inc., a company providing technology for online gaming and a director of Leju Holdings Ltd., an online-to-offline (O2O) real estate services provider in China.
