= IResearch Consulting Group =

iResearch Consulting Group (艾瑞咨询集团)
- Industry: Internet industry
- Founded: 2002
- Founder: Henry Yang
- Headquarters: Shanghai, China
- Products: Internet media Online games
- Parent: Focus Media Holding Ltd
- Website: www.iresearch.com.cn

iResearch Consulting Group (Chinese: 艾瑞咨询集团) is a professional market research and consulting company, supplying online business services in China. The company focuses on Internet media, e-commerce, online games, wireless value-added, and various new economic fields, which relate to the Internet industry in China. The company was founded in 2002 by Henry Yang.

The company was founded in 2002 and is based in Shanghai with a branch offices in Beijing and Guangzhou. As of September 28, 2007, iResearch Consulting Group is a subsidiary of Focus Media Holding Ltd. It was the first professional market research company in China that focused on Internet media. The founder, Henry Yang, who graduated from East China University of Science and Technology, was among the first crop of Internet industry professionals in China. Before iResearch, he joined Soim in 1998 as a marketing manager. In late 1999, he took responsibility for overhauling the WiseCast website. WiseCast.com, established in 1997, was one of the earliest Internet advertising and marketing companies.

== Products ==
The company offers iAdTracker, an Internet-based independent online advertising monitor and analysis system; iDataCenter, a daily updated database of research reports, news, and statistical charts on China's Internet industry; iUserSurvey, a professional online consumer analysis service; and iClick survey community, a data support platform for iResearch's online survey operations. It also operates information Web sites to provide various and detailed Internet news and resources for Internet operators, marketing developers, government industry researchers, and various people who have an interest in Internet economics.
