= Tencent Weibo =

Chinese microblogging website

- Website type: microblogging
- Available in: Chinese, English
- Dissolved: September 28, 2020; 6 years ago
- Owner: Tencent Holdings Ltd
- Website: t.qq.com at the Wayback Machine (archived September 5, 2020)
- Commercial: Yes
- Launched: April 1, 2010; 16 years ago
- Current status: Defunct

Tencent Weibo
- Simplified Chinese: 腾讯微博
- Traditional Chinese: 騰訊微博
Transcriptions
Standard Mandarin
- Hanyu Pinyin: Téngxùn Wēibó
- Bopomofo: ㄊㄥ˙ㄒㄩㄣ˙ㄨㄟ˙ㄅㄛ˙
- Wade–Giles: T'eng-Hsun Wei-Po
- Tongyong Pinyin: Téngsyùn Wēibó
Yue: Cantonese
- Yale Romanization: Tàhng Seun Mèih Bok
- Jyutping: Tang^{4} Seon^{3} Mei^{4} Bok^{3}

Tencent Weibo was a Chinese microblogging (weibo) website launched by Tencent in April 2010, and was shut down on September 28, 2020. Users could broadcast a message including 140 Chinese characters at most through the web, SMS or smartphone.

== Introduction ==
Tencent Weibo was a social network that connected all users together, and enhanced communication between friends. Users could share photos, videos and text with a 140-character limit. The reposting function of Tencent Weibo was similar to Twitter's "retweeting", which was replied in @ form. In comparison, Tencent Weibo encourages users to create new topics on their own. With the support of QQ, Tencent didn't intend to launch Tencent Weibo at a strategic level, but as a marketing tactic to curb competitors.

Some Chinese celebrities were Tencent Weibo users, including, Ma Huateng, Zhou Hongyi, Liu Xiang and Jet Li.

== Features ==
Initially only QQ users could register Tencent Weibo account corresponding to their own QQ number. Weibo accounts were not automatically registered for QQ users, they needed to log into their Tencent Weibo page for registration. Email address could be used for registration (formerly only QQ email address were supported). Posts could be shortened into an url.cn domain name. Each user could follow up to 2,000 people. Through the QQ client (Windows Simplified Chinese version of the QQ2010 Beta 3 or later version), QQ Pinyin input method, computer, smartphone (iPhone, Android OS, S60, and KJava), SMS and MMS, users could broadcast microblogging messages. In addition, photos could be inserted in all form, except SMS. Also, users could add videos (Tencent Video) and songs (QQ Music).

Terms in Tencent Weibo compared to Twitter
Tencent Weibo	Translation	English version	Twitter
立即收听	Listen	Follow	
收听	Listening	Following	
听众	Audience / Listeners	Follower(s)	
广播	Broadcast	Post	Tweet
n条广播	n broadcast	n post(s)	n tweet(s)
转播	Rebroadcast	Repost	Retweet
对话	Talk	Reply	
名单	List		

== History ==
Early in 2007, Tencent launched a microblogging-like website Taotao.com. However, due to some operating problems, on January 26, 2010, Tencent announced to shut down and merge the website into the Qzone. Later in March, Qoocu.com (a blog focusing on products of Tencent) released some screenshots of the internal beta test of Tencent Weibo. On April 1, Tencent began its public beta test, people with an invitation code might take part in the test. And on the same day, Tencent released its QQ2010 version Beta3, with the microblogging feature included. In the second quarter of 2012 it had 469 million registered users. On July 23, 2014, Tencent Inc announced that it will integrate its micro-blogging service's operation team into the company's news team, after media reported that it has dismissed its micro-blogging department and will stop upgrading its micro-blogging service. In September 2020, Tencent shut down their Weibo.

== Developer platform ==
Tencent Weibo acted as an 'open' platform for developers and users to communicate and share data widely. After signing on, developers and users could use the open API to create an application. Through the application, they could obtain information or spread new information.
