= Renren =

Chinese social networking service

Renren Inc.

- Screenshot
- Company type: Public (NYSE: RENN)
- Available in: Chinese
- Founded: December 2005
- Headquarters: Beijing, China
- Area served: China
- Founders: Wang Xing, Wang Huiwen, Lai Binqiang
- Industry: Social networking service
- Employees: 4,602
- Advertising: Banner ads, referral marketing
- Registration: Required
- Current status: Dormant

The Renren Network (Chinese: 人人网; pinyin: Rénrénwǎng; lit. 'Everyone's Network'), formerly known as the Xiaonei Network (Chinese: 校内网; pinyin: Xiàonèiwǎng; lit. 'on-campus network'), was a Chinese social networking service similar to Facebook. It was popular among college students. Renren Inc. had its headquarters in Chaoyang District, Beijing, with additional offices in Shanghai and Guangzhou. Renren at one point had a $740m initial public offering (IPO) on the New York Stock Exchange in April 2011.

== History ==
Renren, which started as Xiaonei.com, was founded by a group of students, including Wang Xing, Wang Huiwen and Lai Binqiang at Tsinghua University and Tianjin University in December 2005. Joseph Chen, who had himself tried to launch a student community website called ChinaRen as early as 1999 and sold it in 2000, acquired Xiaonei through his new company Oak Pacific in October 2006.

Born in 1970 in China, Chen moved with his family to the US where he studied at the Massachusetts Institute of Technology and later earned an MBA from Stanford University.

In March 2008, Xiaonei launched its WAP version, which users can access through mobile phones. Xiaonei features an instant messaging service (Rénrénzhuōmiàn, Chinese: 人人桌面) designed typically for its users using XMPP, which is more popular than Facebook chat.

Initially, users were only able to use the site from specific IP addresses belonging to colleges. This was done to encourage users to use their real identities on the service. In August 2009, Xiaonei officially changed its name to Renren, as well as its domain to www.renren.com. And also, the logo has changed from the Chinese word "xiaonei" to the Chinese word "renren" ("ren", meaning "people" or "person", and "everyone" when used twice in a row). This name change from 'inside the school' (Xiaonei 校内) to 'everybody' (renren 人人) reflected the expansion aspirations held by Oak Pacific – to be more than a network dedicated to students, but instead be the biggest Chinese social network website.

In April 2011, the company filed with the SEC to raise $584 million in a US IPO, offering Renren stock on the New York Stock Exchange. The company reported 2010 revenue of US$76 million. In April 2020, Renren received a non-complicance letter from the New York Stock Exchange, and ultimately delisted in approximately December 2022.

The site began displaying reduced functionality in approximately September 2022, with for example no means of creating a new account for those who do not already have one, and the links to various sub-pages like "Renren Music" or "Renren Video" leading to empty placeholder pages. Finally, in December 2024 the site was taken down altogether for an unspecified "update." The lack of any advance warning that the site was being brought down, possibly forever, led to a degree of outrage from users who had not backed up photos and other sentimentally valuable content stored on their accounts.

== Corporate affairs ==
Renren Inc. has its headquarters on the 23rd floor of the Jing An Center (S: 静安中心, T: 靜安中心, P: Jìng'ān Zhōngxīn) in Chaoyang District, Beijing. Renren has its Shanghai office in the SOHO Zhong Shan Square (S: SOHO中山广场, T: SOHO中山廣場, P: SOHO Zhōngshān Guǎngchǎng) in Changning District, Shanghai. Renren has its Guangzhou office in the China Shine Plaza (S: 耀中广场, T: 耀中廣場, P: Yàozhōng Guǎngchǎng) in Tianhe District, Guangzhou.

In February 2011, Renren made a pre-IPO announcement that it had 160 million registered users. Later, in April 2011, it had to update its statement accurately to "a total of 31 million active monthly users."

== Open platform ==
In July 2007, Xiaonei officially facilitated its open platform, allowing third parties to integrate with platform by rendering modifications and adding functionalities. The APIs Xiaonei listed are quite similar to those Facebook provided, and some of Xiaonei's developers are developing based on the SDK of Facebook.

== Privacy policy ==
Renren has a privacy policy to preserve personal information. Different privacy levels for profile, contact info and blogs can be modified in the privacy settings, thus others that fail to match the privacy requirements cannot browse the specific information or contents of a given user.

In April 2008, SoftBank bought a 14% share of Xiaonei, becoming its largest shareholder. As a result, a rumor came out that “the personal data of millions of Chinese college students on Xiaonei will be exposed to the Japanese since the Japanese company became the boss of Xiaonei". Soon, such claim was spread all over various popular forums, QQ groups, and social networking sites like Xiaonei. Later, Xiaonei declared the denouncement towards its rivals for slander and denied what had been described in the rumor.

=== Privacy leak April 2011 ===
On April 29, 2011 a number of Renren users received a personal message saying that there's someone loving you, along with a piece of malicious code, providing the user's ID, name, school, birth date, cell-phone number, MSN, etc. to a third-party website. Such personal message exploited a bug of Renren and a built-in automatic-forwarding feature. So a great number of users were affected. On the next day, such news was reported by major IT news websites in China but those articles were removed. Only a series of screenshots, a short statement and a piece of attacking code survived. The community has criticized Renren's reaction towards this event. They did not clarify what happened to its users or to the media, but tried to delete the data and also made use of its public relationship team to delete the posts on every IT news websites.

== Functions ==
Renren is a typical SNS with a variety of functions with its own characteristics. In general, it is updated once or twice a year when the system's functions require rectification and further development. In addition, it changes the web page's design on special days, like Spring Festival or National Day.

=== Profile ===
As Renren mainly caters to college students, the key information to make one's identity effective is college, high school, middle school and hometown. At present, 32,000 universities and colleges, 56,000 high schools and 85,000 companies in China and 1,500 universities in 29 other countries are available on Renren's confirmation system. The social networks for each of these specified colleges, schools and companies have been established. In the additional section of personal profiles, users can also put on information about their contact information, hobbies, favorite music, movies, the clubs they joined, etc. To personalize the profile, Renren has also developed functions to edit profile music and background.

=== Friends ===
Registered users can add friends to the friend list. By specifying educational information in the profile, a user can easily find other users. Users can be also affiliated with groups (usually an existing class, school or organization).

=== Applications and censorship ===
There are some common kinds of expressions on Renren, such as renewing the mood (lit. updating personal state), blogging, voting and sharing others' blogs. In addition, users upload photos and share photos, articles and external links (usually videos). Leaving a message or commenting on photos, blogs, status, etc. is quite commonly seen; the interacting users leaving and replying to messages is considered a prominent instance of basic communication on Renren. Activities can be held online by calling on friends to participate. There are also several peripheral applications, such as online mini games, regular games, doggies, testing, parking lot, and selling and buying of friends.

However, Renren's censorship is fairly strict, especially to sensitive keywords in the blogs, compared with other SNS websites in China. Blog entries containing keywords like Tiananmen Square Massacre, Falun Gong and Zhao Ziyang cannot be released. Others that are suspected to be related to political topics, obscenity or thrillers are manually censored by administrators, delaying or blocking their release.

Renrenzhuomian is a kind of instant message service provided to renren.net users and it is established in 2009. It allows users viewing news and messages online, generating new short blogs, replying to others, and forwarding news by simply opening this software and logging into the account.

Nowadays, people prefer to install this program to log onto Renren rather than login to the original webpage on browsers. This is mainly because the establishment of Renrenzhuomian mobile app.

Additional functions include:

- Log in with an invisible status

One can click to choose their online status and if they choose the "invisible status", others cannot see. This function is useful when someone wants to peek at some news but wants to remain anonymous.

- Online chatting

Multi-users chatting is available in Renrenzhuomian. One can talk to several people at the same time and all people will be added to a chatting group automatically.

- GIF emoticon

GIF emoticon is available in Renrenzhuomian, which is not supported technically on the websites. GIF emoticon can present more vivid expression and young users like this function.

- Batch picture downloading

Renrenzhuomian enables users to download all the pictures in an album in a single click. Batch downloading function is not available on renren websites however it is available on mobile apps and it quite effective when you need it.

- Widget notification

User gets notification when someone replies or when fresh news is posted by friends. Renrenzhuomian provides faster and more effective notification.

=== Academic studies ===
Unlike many other social networks, Renren has collaborated with academic researchers to understand the growth and structure of its user community. The results have produced several academic publications. One of the first studies studied the Renren social graph structure and found it similar to prior studies of Facebook's social graph. The study also used Renren's unique feature, a per-user "recent visitors" log, to create an anonymous history of users and how they browse each other's profiles, which was the first of its kind. A second study detailed the process of analyzing and improving detection of fake users (also called Sybil accounts) on Renren.

=== Points and levels ===
Renren users earn "points" for various activities, such as logging in regularly, posting updates, and receiving comments and replies from contacts. As users earn points, their "level" on the website increases, and at certain levels users gain extra privileges such as access to additional emoticons, skins for their profile, and the ability to view other users' profiles without their knowledge. Alternatively, users can gain access to all privileges by paying a monthly fee to become a VIP user.

=== Renrendou ===
The Renrendou, or Renren beans (人人豆), is the virtual currency on Renren. Due to some functions charging users fees, Renrendou can be used to purchase gifts, commence the Purple Bean service (紫豆服务), exchange for game coins and advertise. 1 RMB is equivalent to 1 Renrendou.

== Kaixin ==
Renren's parent company, Oak Pacific Interactive, launched a copy of Kaixin001 called Kaixin. On September 29, 2010, Oak Pacific announced it would integrate Renren with Kaixin. Users can use the same username to log into Renren and Kaixin. Kaixin used the same layout as Kaixin001.

On April 11, 2011, Renren was found guilty of infringing on Kaixin001's rights and ordered to pay 400,000 yuan to its rival. Kaixin001.com announced on April 26, 2011 that it had appealed the April 11 ruling as it was unsatisfied with the amount of compensation as well as the lack of change regarding Renren's usage of Kaixin.com. It also demanded an official apology.

== See also ==
- Pengyou
- FaceKoo
- List of social networking websites
- Internet in China
