= Sohu =

Chinese Internet company founded in 1996

Sohu, Inc.
- Company type: Public
- Traded as: Nasdaq: SOHU
- Founded: August 1996; 30 years ago
- Headquarters: Beijing, China; Delaware, United States
- Founders: Charles Zhang and Edward Roberts
- Key people: Charles Zhang (president, chairman, CEO); Carol Yu (CFO)
- Industry: Internet
- Products: Online services
- Revenue: ▼584 million USD (2025)
- Net income: ▲394 million USD (2025)
- Employees: 7,098 (December 2012)
- Website: sohu.com

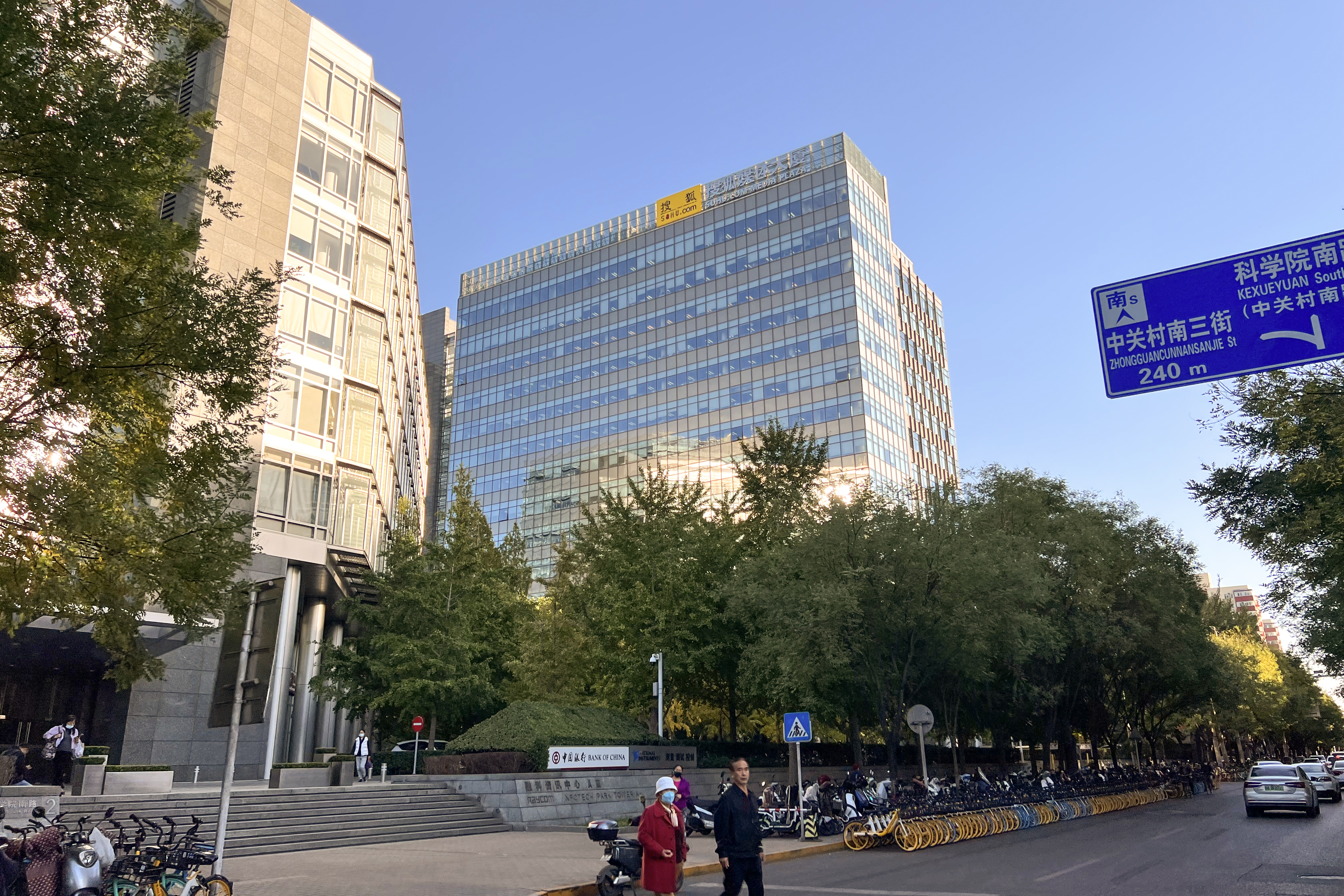
Sohu.com Media Plaza

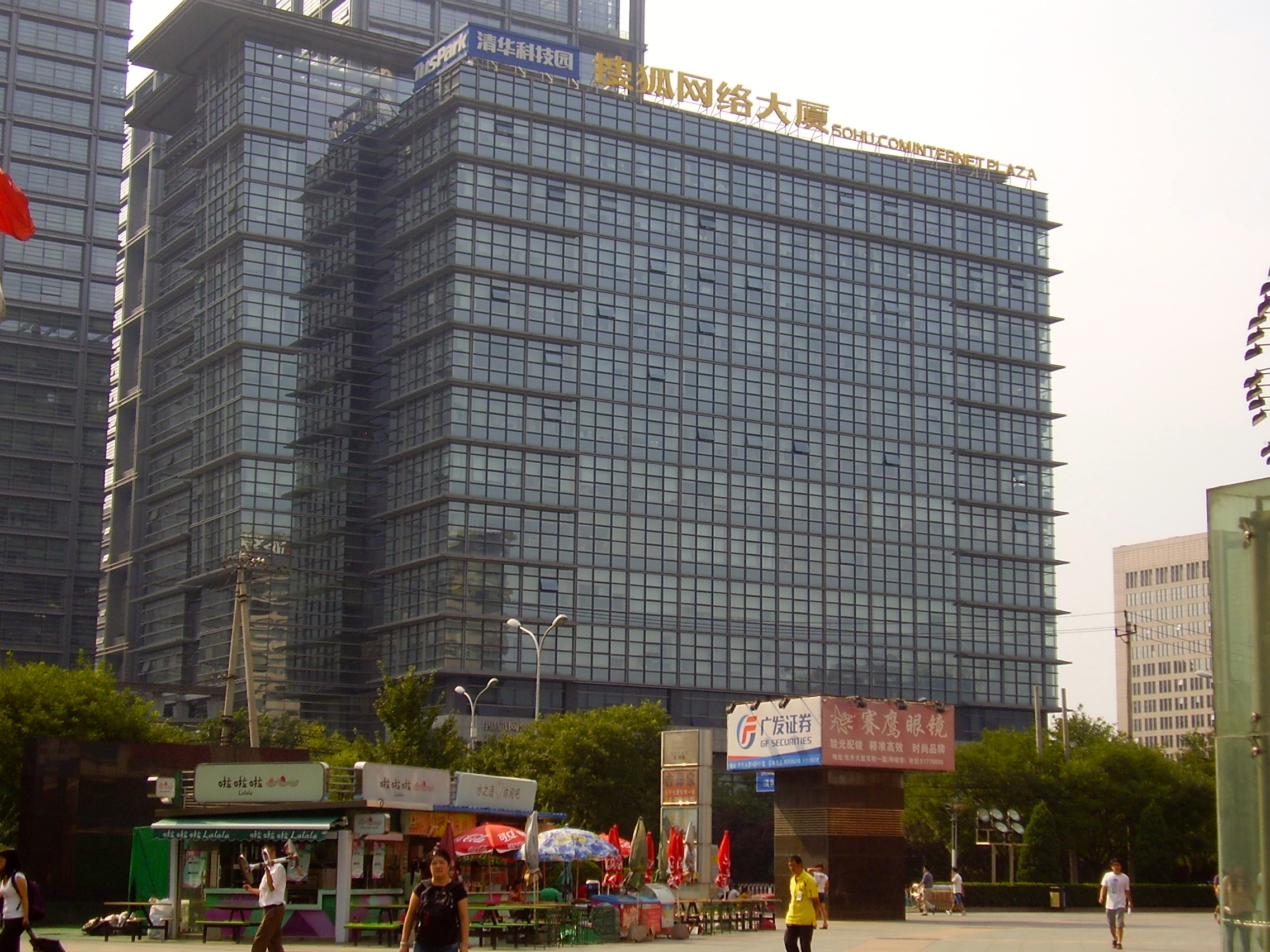
Sohu.com Internet Plaza

Sohu, Inc. (Chinese: 搜狐; pinyin: Sōuhú; lit. 'Search-fox') is a Chinese Internet company headquartered in the Sohu Internet Plaza in Haidian District, Beijing. Sohu and its subsidiaries offer advertising, a search engine (Sogou.com), on-line multiplayer gaming (ChangYou.com) and other services.

== History ==
Sohu was founded as Internet Technologies China (ITC) in 1996 by Charles Zhang after he completed his PhD from the Massachusetts Institute of Technology and received venture capital funding from colleagues he met there. The following year, Zhang changed the name of ITC to Sohoo in homage to Yahoo! after meeting its cofounder, Jerry Yang; the name was soon after changed to Sohu to differentiate it from the American company.

In 2000, Sohu (NASDAQ: SOHU) was officially listed on NASDAQ, through a variable interest entity (VIE). Later that same year, in September, announced Sohu the acquisition of ChinaRen, one of China's largest youth community websites. In October, Sohu was ranked by Forbes among the "300 Best Small Companies in the World."

Sohu's search engine Sogou entered talks in July 2013 to be sold to Qihoo for around $1.4 billion, although the deal did not go through. In September 2013, it was announced that Tencent invested $448 million for a minority share in Chinese search engine Sogou. Around the same period, Tencent discontinued its Soso search engine and its search-related assets were integrated into Sogou. In 2021, Tencent completed its acquisition of Sogou, taking it private.

Sohu was ranked as the world's third- and twelfth-fastest growing company by Fortune in 2009 and 2010, respectively.

== Allegations against Google ==
On April 6, 2007, Sohu made a request that Google stop providing its Google Pinyin Input Method Editor software for download because portions of Sohu's IME software, Sogou Pinyin, were allegedly copied in order to construct it. The detection of the alleged copyright infringement was found due to a suspicious error found in both IMEs, notably the translation of the pinyin "pinggong" which erroneously produces the actor and comedian Feng Gong. On April 9, 2007, Google's spokesman Cui Jin has admitted that the pinyin Google IME "was built leveraging some non-Google database resources."

== 2008 Olympic Games Coverage ==
In November 2005, Sohu was selected to be the Official Internet Content Service Sponsor of the Beijing 2008 Olympic Games. Sohu was provided exclusive services to construct, operate and host the official Beijing Olympics website. During the first week of the Olympics, Sohu recorded peak traffic levels, including 3 million visits within 5 minutes and over 100 million visits within one hour, setting multiple records.
