= Red Burns =

Canadian art academic (1925–2013)

Goldie "Red" Burns (née Gennis; April 9, 1925 – August 23, 2013) was a chair of the Interactive Telecommunications Program (ITP) in the Tisch School of the Arts at New York University. She was known as the "Godmother of Silicon Alley", New York's technology district.

== Personal life and education ==
Goldie Gennis was born in 1925 in Ottawa, Ontario, Canada, the youngest of the three children of two Russian immigrants. Her hair color inspired her nickname Red. When she graduated from high school early at the age of 16, her parents considered her too young to go to college, so she went to Montreal for an internship at the National Film Board of Canada where she trained as a documentary filmmaker.

She married Alex Myers, an editor at the film board, with whom she had a son Michael and a daughter Barbara. Her husband died suddenly in 1953 when she was 28, leaving her with children who were six and three.

Burns then took work with a television distribution company and seven years after the death of her first husband, married one of her co-workers, Lloyd Burns. He had a teenaged daughter from a previous marriage, and together the couple had another daughter Catherine Lloyd Burns. The family moved from Toronto to New York City in the late 1960s. Lloyd Burns died in 1970.

== Career in technology ==
Around the time of her second husband's death, Burns began her interest in social uses of technology, including the possibility that everybody could make documentaries. This interest was sparked when she attended a demonstration of the Sony Portapak camera, the first portable video camera, in 1970.

Inspired, she met with David Oppenheim, a former dean of the Tisch School of the Arts, who referred her to George C. Stoney and the film school at New York University. The two co-taught a video production course, which focused on the use of video in a community-based context. As part of the course, students taught residents in the Washington Heights district of Manhattan how to use video to pressure city hall into giving them a new traffic light. With Stoney, Burns co-founded an informal program, the Alternate Media Center at Tisch School of the Arts's in 1971.

Among her projects at this research center for new technologies were a two-way cable system and interactive television through which senior citizens in Reading, Pennsylvania, could communicate with each other and get information about social services. She also used telecommunications systems to provide services to increase the independence of developmentally disabled individuals in Vermont and pioneered an early teletext trial.

Out of the Alternate Media Center, Martin Elton developed the Interactive Telecommunications Program in 1979; Burns directed it from 1983. Burns emphasized the importance of housing such projects within an art school context, stating that "People who come from other disciplines, not just computer scientists, can now create their own forms of communication. Doctors and architects and educators can use more than words—they can use pictures and sound." Burns believed strongly in the strength of creativity over technical aptitude, stating "To me, the computer is just another tool. It's like a pen. You have to have a pen, and to know penmanship, but neither will write the book for you".

During her work with the Interactive Telecommunications Program, 3000 students were awarded diplomas. One of the students who caught Burns's eye was Dennis Crowley, creator of Dodgeball and Foursquare. Crowley called ITP "a playground, almost, for people who are really enthusiastic about tech and the user experience and using technology to enrich people’s lives".

In addition to her work with ITP, Burns was also named Tokyo Broadcasting System Chair at NYU in 1997.

== Death ==
At the time of her death, Burns was the Principal Investigator on two Intel and Microsoft-funded major research projects. Although she was no longer the director, she still taught a course at ITP and went there every day. She died in 2013 at age 88 in her Manhattan home.

== Awards and memberships ==
Burns won many awards including:

- Crain's All-Stars Educator's Award (1998)
- Mayor of New York's Award for Excellence in Science and Technology (1998)
- "Special Educator's Award" (1998)
- Art Directors Club of New York's Hall of Fame (1998)
- Chrysler Design Award (2002)
- New York Hall of Science Distinguished Leadership Award for achievement in technology (2004)
- New York Women in Communications, Inc. Matrix Hall of Fame (2005)
- Canadian New Media Lifetime Achievement Award (2009)
- Honoree at the Exploratorium's 32nd Annual Awards Dinner honoring Women in Science (2009)

Burns was notably named in:

- Richard Saul Wurman's "Who's Really Who 1000, The Most Creative Individuals in the USA 2002"
- "Crain's" cited her as one of the "Top 100 People Who Will Shape New York"
- Interactive Week picked her as one of the "Top 25 Influential People on the Net"
- Newsweek's "50 for the Future"
- New York Magazine's "New York Cyber Sixty"
- Silicon Alley's 100
- "Crain's New York Business" as one of the 100 top leaders of New York's economy and top 100 most influential women in business

Burns also served as:

- Board member, The Charles Revson Foundation
- Board member, The Art Director's Club
- Board member, Creative Capital
- Advisory Board member,"Seminars on Science," a program of The National Center for Science, Literacy, and Technology, which is part of the American Museum of National History
- Mentor to the Ross School in East Hampton, New York
- Education advisor to the New Museum of Contemporary Art
- Advisory Board member, the New York Times Digital Company Advisory Board, IVREA Institute (Italy)
- The Visual Media Task Force
- The Convergent Media Group
- Electronic Neighborhood
- ProBono.net

Burns was a founding member of the Media Lab Europe Board, the Board of Directors of the New York New Media Association (NYNMA), and she served as a juror for the On-Line Journalism Awards, the National Magazine Awards, and the Webby Awards.

Burns also served on panels for The National Design Awards and The Rockefeller Foundation New Media Fellowship, juror for the Creative Capital Grants, and The American Institute of Graphic Arts "365: AIGA Annual Design Competitions."
