= 4th Shorty Awards =

Awards show for short-form social web media content

The 4th Annual Shorty Awards
- Date: March 27, 2012
- Location: The Times Center, New York City
- Hosted by: Samantha Bee, Jason Jones

The 4th Annual Shorty Awards featured Ricky Gervais and Tiffani Thiessen. 1.6 million tweeted nominations were made across all the categories to honor the top users on Twitter, Facebook, Tumblr, Foursquare, YouTube and other internet platforms.

The ceremony took place on March 27, 2012 at the Times Center and was hosted by Samantha Bee and Jason Jones. The show began with welcomes from Anderson Cooper and Piers Morgan, with the Gregory Brothers performing live. Tracy Morgan was featured in a short video made for the ceremony. Mayor Mike Bloomberg accepted an award presented by Foursquare co-founder and CEO Dennis Crowley.

== Fourth Annual Influencer Winners by category ==
Category	Winner
Best in Activism	Justin Wedes, Occupy Wall Street, @OccupyWallStNYC
Best Actor	Nathan Fillion, @NathanFillion
Best Actress	Tara Strong, @tarastrong
Best in Apps	Instagram, @Instagram
Best Band	Jonas Brothers, @JonasBrothers
Best Celebrity	Justin Bieber, @justinbieber
Best Charity	Random Acts, @therandomactorg
Best Comedian	Jim Norton, @JimNorton & Matt Walker, @funnymatt
Best Director	Alfredo Flores, @AlfredoFlores & Katherine Brooks, @thekatbrooks
Best Fake Account	The Fake ESPN, @TheFakeESPN & Dilma Rousseff, @diimabr
Best Fansite	Sherlockology, @Sherlockology
Best in Fashion	Luke Reichle, @redcarpetluke
Best in Finance	Goldman Sachs Elevator Gossip, @GSElevator
Best in Food	Epic Meal Time, @EpicMealTime & Mud Baron, @Cocoxochitl
Best in Gaming	The Sims 3, @TheSims3
Best in Government	NASA, @NASA
Best in Green	Jerry James Stone, @jerryjamesstone
Best in Humor	Ryan Higa, @TheRealRyanHiga & Christian Beadles, @LittlecBeadles
Best Journalist	Andy Carvin, @acarvin
Best Life Saving Hero	FDNY, @FDNY
Best in Music	Justin Bieber, @justinbieber
Best in Photography	Adam Bouska, @bouska
Best in Science	Nature News & Comment, @NatureNews
Best in Social Fitness	Christopher Brisley, @TakeAChallenge
Best Sports Team	Liverpool Football Club, @LFC
Best in Travel	Charles Trippy, @charlestrippy
Best Television Show	Attack of the Show, @aots
Best Video Blogger	Fafa the Groundhog, @FafaGroundhog
Best in Weather	Andy Gabrielson, @FindTheTornado
Best Web Show	Awkward Black Girl, @awkwardblkgrl
Best YouTube Star	Curtis Paradis, @CurtisParadis

== Fourth Annual Brand Winners by category ==
Category	Winner
Best Branded YouTube Channel	KungFu Panda 2 YouTube Brand Channel
Best Integration of Social Media with Live Television	Viacom (MTV Networks): VMA Twitter Tracker
Best Location-Based Marketing	Walgreens: Check-ins That Make a Difference
Best Overall Brand Presence on Facebook	Nickelodeon: SpongeBob GayPants
Best Overall Brand Presence on Tumblr	BBC America: Doctor Who Tumblr
Best Overall Brand Presence on Twitter	Bob Maron: @CharlieSheen
Best Social Commerce	Viking Range Corporation: Leanne Gault
Best Social Media Campaign for Film	Paramount Pictures: Super 8 Movie - Super 8 Secret
Best Social Media Campaign for Gaming	Promethium Marketing: Discover Your Legacy - Assassin's Creed: Revelations
Best Social Media Campaign for Television	USA Network: Psych HashTag Killer
Best Social Media Manager	Stephanie Schierholz, @NASA
Best Use of a Hashtag on Twitter	Bob Maron, @CharlieSheen
Best Use of Facebook in a Campaign	HBO: True Blood “Immortalize Yourself” Facebook Application
Best Use of Foursquare in a Campaign	Walgreens: Check-ins That Make a Difference
Best Use of Game Mechanics (Gamification) in a Social Media Campaign	Nickelodeon's ‘Kids’ Choice Awards 2011’
Best Use of Social Media for a Consumer Product or Service	360i: Dentyne Safe Breath Alliance
Best Use of Social Media for Customer Service	Research in Motion: Support At The Scale of BlackBerry
Best Use of Social Media for News	CNN Worldwide: The Global Networks of CNN Dominate on Social Media
Best Use of Social Media for Sports	Major League Baseball: MLB Fan Cave
Best Use of Social Media in a Mobile Campaign	Viacom (MTV Networks): VMA Twitter Tracker for iOS for Verizon
Best Use of Social Media in an Awards Show	Viacom (MTV Networks): 2011 VMAs (Twitter/Tumblr + Twitter Tracker)
Best Use of Social Media In Real Life (“IRL”)	Wieden + Kennedy & Digital Kitchen: Dodge Journey - The Search Engine for the Real World
Best Use of Twitter Ad Platform	Edelman: Volkswagen's All-New 2012 Beetle Launch
Best Use of the Twitter in a Campaign	9/11 Commemoration
Best Use of Video in a Social Media Campaign	CNN Worldwide: The Royal Wedding of William & Kate; Group SJR: TED - Ideas Worth Spreading
Best Viral Campaign	BuzzFeed: Schick Xtreme 3 Razorbombing, Walgreens: Check-ins That Make a Difference
Boldest Social Media Campaign of 2011	VH-1: Do Something Awards: Give a Shit!

== Special awards ==
Category	Winner
The Shorty Vox Populi Award	Agnes Monica, @agnezmo
Quora Answer of the Year	Matan Shelomi for answering,“If you injure a bug, should you kill it or let it live?” & Justin Freeman for answering, “What’s the best way to escape the police in a high-speed car chase?”
Foursquare Mayor of the Year	Michael Bloomberg, @MikeBloomberg
Real-Time Photo of the Year	Stefanie Gordon, @Stefmara, for tweeting a photo of Space Shuttle Endeavour from a commercial airliner & Louise Macabitas for the photo “Police Pepper-Spraying UC Davis Students.”
Microblog of the Year on Tumblr	We Are the 99 Percent, created by Christopher Key
