= Ed Begley Jr. =

American actor and activist (born 1949)

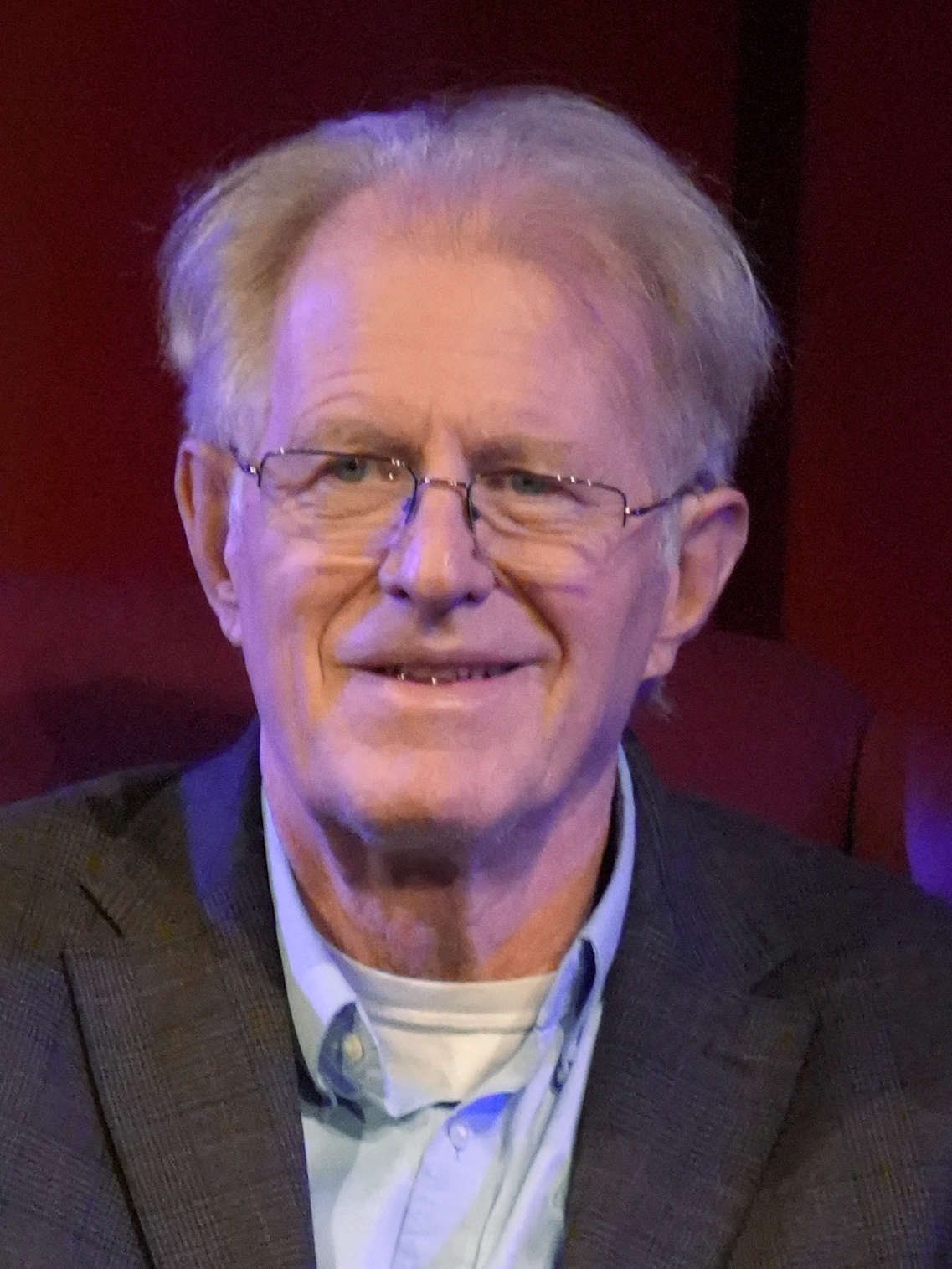
- Begley in 2025
- Born: Edward James Begley Jr. September 16, 1949 (age 77); Los Angeles, California, U.S.
- Occupations: Actor; environmentalist
- Years active: 1967–present
- Spouses: Ingrid Taylor (m. 1976–1989) Rachelle Carson (m. 2000)
- Children: 3
- Relatives: Ed Begley (father)
- Website: edbegley.com

Edward James Begley Jr. (born September 16, 1949) is an American actor and environmentalist who has appeared in hundreds of films, series, and plays.

The son of Academy Award-winning actor Ed Begley, he came to prominence for his role as Dr. Victor Ehrlich on the television series St. Elsewhere (1982–1988), which earned him six consecutive Primetime Emmy Award nominations and a Golden Globe Award nomination. He also co-hosted, along with his wife Rachelle Carson, the green living reality show Living with Ed (2007–2010), and had recurring roles as Clifford Main in Better Call Saul (2016–2022) and Dr. Grant Linkletter in Young Sheldon (2019–2024).

Begley's film appearances include Blue Collar (1978), An Officer and a Gentleman (1982), This Is Spinal Tap (1984), Transylvania 6-5000 (1985), The Accidental Tourist (1988), Scenes from the Class Struggle in Beverly Hills (1989), She-Devil (1989), Batman Forever (1995), and Pineapple Express (2008). He is a recurring cast member in the mockumentaries of Christopher Guest and Eugene Levy, including Best in Show (2000), A Mighty Wind (2003), For Your Consideration (2006), and Mascots (2016). He and his wife Rachelle appear in the mockumentary Reboot Camp (2020).

== Early life ==
Edward James Begley Jr. was born in Los Angeles on September 16, 1949, the son of Allene Jeanne Sanders and actor Ed Begley (1901–1970). His paternal grandparents were Irish immigrants. At the time of his birth, his father was still married to Amanda Huff, who died of cancer when Begley Jr. was seven. Until he was 16, he believed Amanda was his biological mother; he only later became acquainted with his biological mother, with whom his father was having an affair.

Begley grew up in Merrick, New York, where he attended the private Catholic school Curé of Ars from kindergarten to seventh grade. He had moved to Merrick with his family when his father appeared on Broadway. When he was 13, the family moved back to California, where he graduated from Van Nuys High School in 1967. He also attended Los Angeles Valley College.

== Career ==
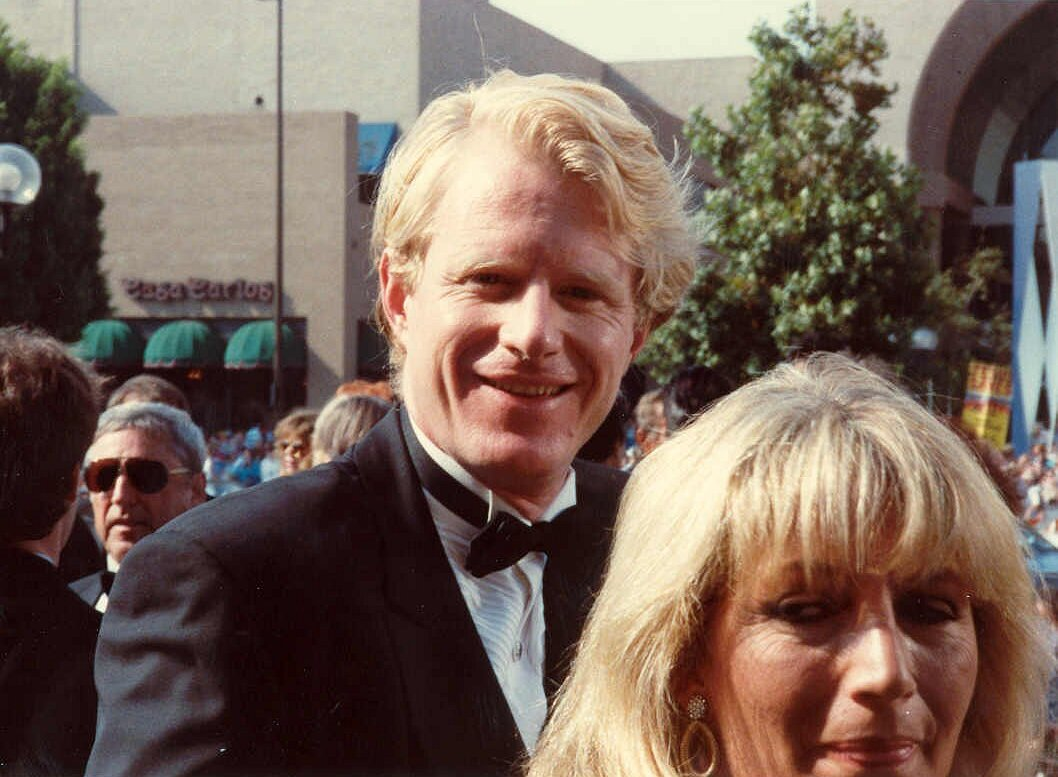
Begley and Penny Marshall at the 1988 Emmy Awards

Begley has had numerous roles in television and film. He appeared as a guest actor on Maude and had guest appearances in the 1970s series Room 222. He had recurring roles on Mary Hartman, Mary Hartman, 7th Heaven, Arrested Development, Meego, and Six Feet Under and starring roles in Stephen King's Kingdom Hospital, St. Elsewhere, and Wednesday 9:30 (8:30 Central). He was in one episode of My Three Sons, playing a tall classmate of Chip's. Begley also had a short-lived improv act with Michael Richards.

He has played significant roles in Christopher Guest's mockumentary films Best in Show, A Mighty Wind, For Your Consideration, and Mascots. Additionally, Begley played Viper pilot Greenbean on the original Battlestar Galactica TV series, Boba Fett in the radio adaptation of Return of the Jedi, and Seth Gillette, a fictional Democratic U.S. senator from North Dakota on The West Wing.

From 2000 to 2016, Begley was a member of the Board of Governors of the Academy of Motion Picture Arts and Sciences. In 1996, he appeared in a TV movie called The Late Shift, where he portrayed CBS executive Rod Perth. He has guest-starred on shows such as Scrubs, Boston Legal, and Star Trek: Voyager. He had a recurring guest role in season three of Veronica Mars. He appeared in the 2008 HBO film Recount, which profiled the 2000 presidential election and its aftermath, which was decided by Florida's electoral votes after the United States Supreme Court halted the counting of the state's popular vote. Begley also made appearances on the third season of Tim and Eric Awesome Show, Great Job! as a spokesman for Cinco.

In 2003, Begley wrote and directed the musical Cesar and Ruben. It was performed at the El Portal Theatre in Los Angeles and was revived in 2007. Begley played Dr. Walter Krandall, the protagonist's former marriage counselor and fiancé of his ex-wife in the CBS sitcom Gary Unmarried. Since 2008 he has been in a series of DirecTV commercials as a "Cable Corp Inc." executive. In 2013, he appeared on the reality television show Beverly Hills Pawn. In 2016, he began appearing in the Breaking Bad prequel and spinoff Better Call Saul as Clifford Main, senior partner at the Davis & Main law firm. Beginning in 2019, he appeared in Bless This Mess for the duration of the two seasons that the show ran.

== Personal life ==
According to a feature on the series Celebrity Close Calls and the podcast Inside of You with Michael Rosenbaum, Begley nearly died in 1972 after being stabbed multiple times in California. He and his roommate had taken a bus ride headed to Gardena, a city in Los Angeles County, California, to play cards. On the way, the bus driver informed them that his route did not stop in Gardena and the two young men ended up being dropped off in a rough neighborhood. Begley and his roommate were then confronted by at least two dozen gang members. Begley, who was around twenty two, suffered a collapsed lung in the midst of being attacked.

Begley was married to Ingrid Taylor from 1976 to 1989. They had a son and a daughter together. In 2000, he married actress Rachelle Carson, with whom he has a daughter.

Begley was diagnosed with Parkinson's disease in 2016.

== Activism ==
=== Environmental ===
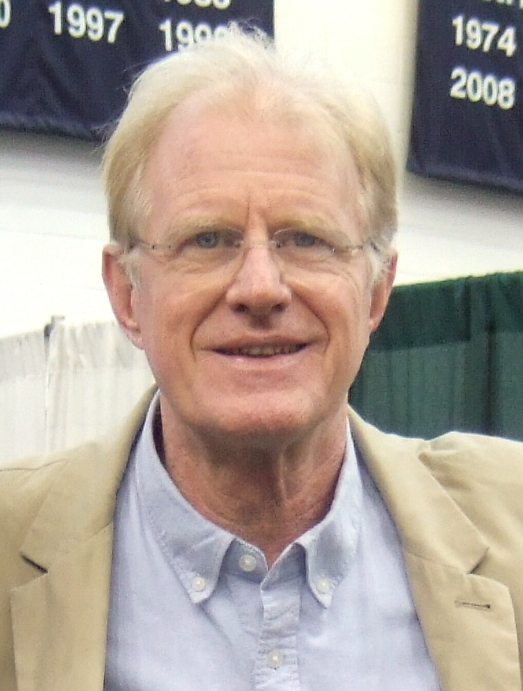
Begley in 2014

Begley has been an environmentalist since 1970, beginning with his first electric vehicle (a Taylor-Dunn golf cart-like vehicle), recycling, and becoming a vegan. He is noted for riding bicycles, using public transportation, and driving a 2003 electric Toyota RAV4 EV. In 2023 and 2024, he made headlines by taking public transit to the Academy Awards.

Begley's former home in Southern California is 1,585 square feet (147.3 m^{2}) in size and uses solar power, wind power (via a PacWind vertical-axis wind turbine), an air conditioning unit made by Greenway Design Group, and an electricity-generating bicycle used to power his toaster. In 2008, he stated that his electricity bills amounted to around $300 per year. Noting that a typical suburban lawn is environmentally unsustainable, especially in Southern California due to water shortages, Begley converted his own garden into a drought-tolerant garden composed of native California plants.

Begley's hybrid electric bicycle was often featured on his television show Living With Ed. He parodied his environmentalism on The Simpsons episode "Homer to the Max" in 1999; he voiced himself as he showcased his "nonpolluting go-kart" powered by his "own sense of self-satisfaction". He also poked fun at himself on an episode of Dharma and Greg. In 2000, the Futurama episode "The Honking" featured a joke in which Begley's electric motor is referred to as "the most evil propulsion system ever conceived". He again voiced himself in The Simpsons episode "Gone Maggie Gone" in 2009; during the episode, a solar eclipse causes his solar-powered car to break down on train tracks as a train approaches, but the train also stops because it is an Ed Begley Jr. Solar Powered Train.

Begley and friend Bill Nye are in a friendly competition to see who can have the lowest carbon footprint.

In 2009, Begley appeared on an Earth Day edition of The Price Is Right. He announced the final showcase, which included an electric bicycle, a solar-powered golf cart and a Toyota Prius.

Begley was featured on the Green Car Challenge of The Jay Leno Show. Various celebrities drove an electric Ford Focus automobile and tried to set records on an outdoor track. During the second lap, cutouts of Begley and Al Gore would pop out; if the celebrity hit either of them, one second was added to their time.

Begley wrote the books Living Like Ed: A Guide to the Eco-Friendly Life (2008) and Ed Begley Jr.'s Guide to Sustainable Living: Learning to Conserve Resources and Manage an Eco-Conscious Life (2009), both published by Random House. He also co-wrote A Vegan Survival Guide for the Holidays (2014) with Jerry James Stone.

==== Affiliations ====
- Coalition for Clean Air
- Environmental Media Association
- Santa Monica Mountains Conservancy
- The American Oceans Campaign
- League of Conservation Voters
- Environmental Research Foundation
- Walden Woods Project
- Thoreau Institute
- Earth Communications Office
- Solar Living Institute
- TreePeople
- Friends of the Earth
- Sequoia ForestKeeper
- Green Wish
- Orang Utan Republik

From 2007 to 2010, Begley and his wife Rachelle Carson starred in their own reality television series, Living with Ed on HGTV and Discovery's Planet Green channel. In 2013 he, his wife and daughter Hayden filmed "On Begley Street", a Web series chronicling the deconstruction of his current home and the "building of North America's greenest, most sustainable home".

He received the Thomas Alva Edison Award for Energy Independence from the American Jewish Congress, the first one to be presented. Begley has been a leader in this field and was recognized in November 2007 for his lifelong work in environmentalism.

=== Political ===
Begley was also on the advisory committee for the group 2004 Racism Watch, founded by fellow actor Ed Asner. The group was formed to respond to the advertisement campaign of the George W. Bush/Dick Cheney presidential campaign that they claimed was encouraging racism. The advertisement in question, "100 Days", made a reference to terrorism and terrorists while highlighting a photograph of an anonymous man of Middle Eastern descent.

== Friendships with other actors ==
=== William Daniels ===
When Begley was a child, his future St. Elsewhere series lead, William Daniels, met Begley's father when the two were working on live television. By the time Begley Jr. grew up, he was already a fan of his mentor's work; he would work with Daniels on St. Elsewhere, where the two had on- and off-screen chemistry for six seasons. Daniels, himself, on the show, was a moody Irishman like Ed Sr., though a far more nurturing father figure. This proved so rich that the role grew beyond even the writers' expectations. Begley Jr. said about his future TV chief of surgery, "I was a huge fan of Bill Daniels. I had seen him in Two for the Road. I had seen him in The Graduate, and in Parallax View. He was an actor I just thought the world of. He played these 'Type A' personalities quite effectively, but (in real life) he is the sweetest guy in the world." He also added: "He is an actor I just thought the world of. I had no delusions about how my character came to be. I rode on the coattails of Bill Daniels... the kind of Mutt and Jeff routine of Dr. Craig looking up and berating a 6 foot 4 doctor Victor Ehrlich. So I owe all my success on the show to Bill Daniels." After the series was canceled, the two still remained friends, living not too far away from each other. In 2002, Daniels and Begley Jr., alongside other surviving St. Elsewhere cast members Stephen Furst and Eric Laneuville, all appeared on an episode of Scrubs.

=== Norman Lloyd ===
Before St. Elsewhere in the early 1980s, the struggling and unknown Begley met Norman Lloyd, who became a mentor to him while Lloyd was directing an episode of Tales of the Unexpected. The two became friends. In a 2014 interview with Jimmy Falcon of Cloverleaf Radio, he said this about Lloyd:

Not only did I enjoy working with him, but I see him fairly regularly. I just had dinner with him 4 nights ago. We had dinner together at Sarah Nichols's house, his neighbor of mine and friend of his. We had a lovely time and reminisced – he's unbelievable. He's going to be 100 years old this year—and still very active, getting around on his own. He's a force of nature, so Norman Lloyd was somebody I idolized. When I was quite young, wow, James Dean is great and this is one and that. Now look at Janis Joplin, what a great voice and Jim Morrison, those people left us so young, like my point of view has change somewhere, in the late 1970s and early 1980s, saying, 'No, you idolized Jimmy Stewart, Gloria Swanson.' The people that have families and happiness and a long, economy life. You know, Norman Lloyd, he wasn't much older than me, when I did St. Elsewhere, and I went 'These are my role models, now, people had a long/happy life and continued to be creative.' Those are my role models, not the people that left us so early and I'm sorry they did, I don't mean to trifle with that, but, my role models changed from the people who had an incredible, brief spurt of creativity and life, but to people that went the distance, they became my role models at some point in my early 30s really.

On November 9, 2014, along with former St. Elsewhere co-stars, Begley attended Lloyd's 100th birthday in Los Angeles. Begley said, "I worked with Norman Lloyd the actor, and Norman Lloyd the director, and no one informed me better on the art of storytelling than that talented man. He is a constant inspiration and my eternal friend."

== Filmography ==
=== Film ===
Year	Title	Role	Notes
1969	The Lottery	Jack Watson	Short film
1969	The Computer Wore Tennis Shoes	Springfield State panelist (J. Flanderka)	Uncredited
1972	Now You See Him, Now You Don't	Druffle	
1972	Where Does It Hurt?	Dr. Quinch	
1973	Charley and the Angel	Derwood Moseby	
1973	Showdown	Pook	
1973	Superdad	The Gang	
1974	Cockfighter	Tom Peeples	
1976	Stay Hungry	Lester	
1977	Handle with Care	The Priest	
1977	Lust of a Eunuch	Lu Ta	Short film
1978	Blue Collar	Bobby Joe	
1978	Battlestar Galactica	Flight Sergeant Greenbean	
1978	Record City	Pokey	
1978	Goin' South	Whitney Haber	
1978	The One and Only	The King	
1979	Hardcore	Soldier	Actor in a pornographic film within a film
1979	The Concorde... Airport '79	Rescuer #1	
1979	The In-Laws	Barry Lutz	
1981	Private Lessons	Jack Travis	
1981	Buddy Buddy	Lieutenant #1	
1982	An Officer and a Gentleman	Altitude Chamber Instructor	Voice
1982	Cat People	Joe Creigh	
1982	Eating Raoul	Hippie	
1982	Young Doctors in Love	Lyle August	
1982	Voyager from the Unknown	Wilbur Wright	Direct-to-video
1982	The Entity	Additional voices	
1983	Get Crazy	Colin Beverly	
1984	Streets of Fire	Ben Gunn	
1984	Protocol	Mr. Hassler	
1984	This Is Spinal Tap	John "Stumpy" Pepys	
1985	Transylvania 6-5000	Gil Turner	
1985	Waiting to Act	Ed	
1987	Amazon Women on the Moon	Griffin	Segment: "Son of the Invisible Man"
1988	The Accidental Tourist	Charles Leary	
1989	Scenes from the Class Struggle in Beverly Hills	Peter Hepburn	
1989	She-Devil	Bob Pattchet	
1990	Meet the Applegates	Richard P. Applegate	
1992	Dark Horse	Jack Mills	
1992	Cruise Control	Fraser	Short film
1993	Even Cowgirls Get the Blues	Rupert	
1994	Renaissance Man	Jack Markin	
1994	The Pagemaster	Alan Tyler	
1994	Greedy	Carl McTeague	
1994	Rave Review	Bert	
1994	Sensation	Earl Strauber	
1995	The Crazysitter	Paul Van Arsdale	
1995	Storybook	Pouch	Voice
1995	Batman Forever	Fred Stickley	Uncredited
1996	Hourglass	Det. Cecil Dish	
1996	Santa with Muscles	Ebner Frost	
1997	The Lay of the Land	Harvey Dankworth	
1997	Ms. Bear	Greg Bradley	
1997	Joey	Ambassador Ted Ross	
1998	I'm Losing You	Zev	
1998	Addams Family Reunion	Phillip Adams	
2000	Best in Show	Mark Schafer	
2001	Get Over It	Frank Landers	
2001	Hellgig	Reverend	Short film
2001	Anthrax	Brent Krawford	
2001	Diary of a Sex Addict	Dr. Aaron Spencer	
2002	Bug	The Dept. of Health Inspector, 'The Hand'	
2002	Auto Focus	Mel Rosen	
2003	Net Games	John Fielding	
2003	A Mighty Wind	Lars Olfen	
2003	Going Down	Oscar Earnest	
2004	Stateside	Father Concoff	
2004	Raising Genius	Dr. Curly Weeks	
2004	Hair High	Rev. Sidney Cheddar	Voice
2005	Back by Midnight	Robert Wade	
2005	Alone in a Crowd	Unknown	Short film
2005	Desolation Sound	Doug Shepard	
2005	Welcome to California	Documentary Narrator	
2006	Who Killed the Electric Car?	Himself	Documentary
2006	Relative Strangers	Mr. Manoire	
2006	For Your Consideration	Sandy Lane	
2006	The Elder Son	Leonard	
2006	Pittsburgh	Himself	
2006	The Legend of William Tell	James Ayers	
2007	One Long Light	Joel	
2007	Hard Four	Governor Begley	
2008	Next of Kin	Patrick	
2008	Balancing the Books	Reverend Vernon	
2008	Fly Me to the Moon	Poopchev	Voice
2008	Pineapple Express	Robert Anderson	
2009	Climate Refugees	Himself	Documentary
2009	He's Such a Girl	Taylor's Father	
2009	Tripping Forward	James Comey	
2009	Whatever Works	John Celestine	
2009	21 and a Wake-Up	Colonel Ritchie	
2010	The Penthouse	Nicholas	
2010	A Turtle's Tale: Sammy's Adventures	GreenPeace Worker	Voice
2011	What's Your Number?	Mr. Darling	
2012	Making Change	Simmons	
2013	Armed Response	Officer Krupke	
2014	Wish Wizard	Wish Wizard	Short film
2014	You're Not You	Uncle Roger	
2015	Climate Change Denial Disorder	Politician	Short film
2016	Time Toys	Wiz	
2016	Ghostbusters	Ed Mulgrave Jr.	
2016	Mascots	A.J. Blumquist	
2016	Imperfections	Barry	
2017	Girlfriend's Day	Butler	
2017	CHiPs	Wasp Driver	
2017	Lucky	Dr. Christian Kneedler	
2017	Amelia 2.0	Paul Wesley	
2018	Making Babies	Dr. Remis	
2018	Book Club	Tom	
2019	Plus One	Chuck	
2020	Reboot Camp	John Lehman	
2022	Amsterdam	Senator Bill Meekins	
2023	Strange Darling	Frederick	
2025	Don't Tell Larry	Bruce	
2026	Let's Have Kids!	Dr. Young	

=== Television ===
Year	Title	Role	Notes
1967	My Three Sons	Marv	Episode: "The Computer Picnic"
1969–1972	Room 222	Bob, Willard, Michael, George, Stretch	7 episodes
1970	The Immortal	Gas Station Attendant	Episode: "White Elephants Don't Grow on Trees"
1971	The Bill Cosby Show	Student #2	Episode: "To Each According to His Appetite"
1971	Adam-12	Bud	Episode: "Million Dollar Bluff"
1971	The F.B.I.	Youngblood	Episode: "The Deadly Gift"
1971	Owen Marshall: Counselor at Law	Howard Dubberly	Episode: "Shadow of a Name"
1971	Nanny and the Professor	Richie Cooper	Episode: "The Great Debate"
1972	Mannix	Attendant	Episode: "Babe in the Woods"
1972	Bobby Jo and the Big Apple Good Time Band	Virgil	Television film (unsold pilot)
1972	Evil Roy Slade	Husband Making Fun of Stool	Television film
1972	Maude	Young Man	Episode: "Maude's Problem"
1972	Ironside	Jimmy Sanders	Episode: "Programmed for Panic"
1972	Wait Till Your Father Gets Home		Voice, episode: "The Beach Vacation"
1972	The Doris Day Show	Wally	Episode: "Debt of Honor"
1972	Family Flight	Driver	Television film
1973	Love, American Style	Dick	Segment: "Love and the Happy Family"
1973–1974	Roll Out	Lieutenant Robert Chapman	12 episodes
1974	Happy Days	Hank	Episode: "The Deadly Dares"
1974 1983	Insight	Father John Jimmy Marty	3 episodes
1975	Medical Center	Greg Duncan	Episode: "Survivors"
1975	Baretta	Ernie	Episode: "A Bite of the Apple"
1976	Mary Hartman, Mary Hartman	Steve	13 episodes
1976	Starsky & Hutch	Harv Schwab	Episode: "Murder at Sea"
1977	Dead of Night	Frank	Television film; segment: "Second Chance"
1977–1981	Quincy, M.E.	Kit Sawyer Walter "Speed" Simpson David Phillips	3 episodes
1978	Wonder Woman	Harold Farnum	2 episodes
1978–1979	Battlestar Galactica	Ensign, Flight Sergeant Greenbean	5 episodes
1978, 1981	Fantasy Island	Amos McAllister Jamie	2 episodes
1978, 1994	Columbo	Officer Stein Irving Krutch	2 episodes
1979	Elvis	D. J. Fontana	Television film
1979	M*A*S*H	Pvt. Paul Conway	Episode: "Too Many Cooks"
1979	Scooby-Doo and Scrappy-Doo	Additional voices	
1979	Hot Rod	Clay	Television film
1979	Laverne & Shirley	Robert "Bobby" Feeney	2 episodes
1979	Charlie's Angels	Kenny	Episode: "Angels on Skates"
1979	Amateur Night at the Dixie Bar and Grill	Moss Tillis	Television film
1979	A Shining Season	John Haaland	Television film
1980	Barnaby Jones	Lindy Powell	Episode: "Death Is the Punchline"
1981	Riker	Ed	Episode: "Honkytonk"
1982	Tales of the Apple Dumpling Gang	Amos Tucker	Television film
1982	Rascals and Robbers: The Secret Adventures of Tom Sawyer and Huckleberry Finn	Jeb	Television film
1982	Not Just Another Affair	Warren Krantz	Television film
1982	Voyagers!	Wilbur Wright	Episode: "Voyagers"
1982	Richie Rich	Additional characters	Voice; Episode: "Dollar's Exercise/Richie's Cube/ The Maltese Monkey/Everybody's Doing It "
1982–1988	St. Elsewhere	Dr. Victor Ehrlich	137 episodes
1982–1989	Walt Disney's Wonderful World of Color	Dr. Jack Brooker, Amos Tucker	3 episodes
1983	The New Leave It to Beaver	Whitey	Episode: "Still the Beaver"
1983	An Uncommon Love	Matt Randolph	Television film
1984	The Love Boat	Allan Bundy	Episode: "Side by Side/A Fish Out of Water/Rub Me Tender"
1984	Tales of the Unexpected	George Princey	Episode: "Wet Saturday"
1984	The Smurfs	Additional voices	Episode: "Symbols of Wisdom/Blue Eyes Returns"
1984	Saturday Night Live	Host	Episode: "Ed Begley Jr/Billy Squier"
1985	Tall Tales & Legends	Ichabod Crane	Episode: "The Legend of Sleepy Hollow"
1985	Pound Puppies	Arnold	Voice, television special
1985	George Burns Comedy Week	Tiny Timothy	Episode: "Christmas Carol II the Sequel"
1985, 1987	Faerie Tale Theatre	Brom Dutcher Wilhelm Grimm	2 episodes
1986	You Are the Jury	Brian Spears	Episode: "The State of Arizona vs. Dr. Evan Blake"
1987	Celebration Family	Jake Foreman	Television film
1987	The Incredible Ida Early	Paul Sutton	Television film
1987	Pound Puppies	Snake	Episode: "Where's the Fire?/The Wonderful World of Whopper"
1987	Roman Holiday	Leonard Lupo	Television film
1988	Spies, Lies & Naked Thighs	Alan	Television film
1990	Timeless Tales from Hallmark	Bertram	Voice, episode: "The Elves and the Shoemaker"
1990	Not a Penny More, Not a Penny Less	Stephen Bradley	Miniseries
1990	In the Best Interest of the Child	Howard Feldon	Television film
1990	The Great Los Angeles Earthquake	Jerry Soloway	Television film
1990–1991	Parenthood	Gil Buckman	12 episodes
1991	Chance of a Lifetime	Darrel	Television film
1991	The Story Lady	Otis	Television film
1992	Batman: The Animated Series	Charlie Collins, Germs	Voice, 2 episodes
1992	In the Line of Duty: Siege at Marion	Lt. Fred House	Television film
1992	Home Fires	Unknown character	Episode: "Fathers and Sons"
1992	Running Mates	Chapman Snow	Television film
1992	Mastergate	Steward Butler	Television film
1992	Shelley Duvall's Bedtime Stories	Narrator	Voice, episode: "Uncle Wizzmo's New Used Car"
1992	Exclusive	Allen	Television film
1992–1993	Captain Planet and the Planeteers	Preston Zoning Commissioner	Voice, 2 episodes
1993	Roseanne	Principal Alexander	Episode: "Crime and Punishment"
1993	Tales from the Crypt	Judd Campbell	Episode: "Death of Some Salesmen"
1993	Partners	"Grave Squad" Lawyer	Television short film
1993	Cooperstown	Dave Cormeer	Television film
1993, 1998	The Larry Sanders Show	Himself	2 episodes
1994	Winnetka Road	Glenn Barker	6 episodes
1994	World War II: When Lions Roared	Harry Hopkins	Miniseries
1994	Columbo	Irving Krutch	Episode: "Undercover"
1994	Mrs. Piggle-Wiggle	Mr. Bean	2 episodes
1994	Incident at Deception Ridge	Jack Davis	Television film
1994	The Magic School Bus	Logaway Larry	Voice, Episode: "Meet the Rot Squad"
1994	The Shaggy Dog	Ron Daniels	Television film
1995	Shining Time Station	Ned Kincaid	Special: Once Upon a Time
1995	Duckman	Barry Brittle	Voice, episode: "Research and Destroy"
1996	Touched by an Angel	Chris Carpenter	Episode: "Til We Meet Again"
1996	3rd Rock from the Sun	Jeff	Episode: "Green-Eyed Dick"
1996	Project ALF	Dr. Warner	Television film
1996	The Late Shift	Rod Perth	Television film
1996	Dave's World	Watterson	Episode: "Stayin' Alive"
1996	ABC Afterschool Special	Mr. Rogers	Episode: "Too Soon for Jeff"
1996	Star Trek: Voyager	Henry Starling	Episode: "Future's End"
1996	Adventures from the Book of Virtues	William Tell	Voice, episode: "Courage"
1997	Meego	Dr. Edward Parker	13 episodes
1997	The Drew Carey Show	Dr. Chris Vanderkamp	Episode: "Cap-Beer-Cino"
1997	Gun	The Director	Episode: "The Shot"
1997	Sabrina the Teenage Witch	Mr. Jeremy T. Rothwell	Episode: "Trial by Fury"
1997	Not in This Town	Henry Whitcomb	Television film
1997	The Nanny	Tom Rosenstein	Episode: "You Bette Your Life"
1997	Alone	Gerald	Television film
1998	Sports Theater with Shaquille O'Neal	John Hanley	Episode: "Scrubs"
1998	Murder She Purred: A Mrs. Murphy Mystery	Fitz-Gilbert Hamilton	Television film
1998	Rugrats	Bob, Waiter	Voice, episode: "Baking Dil/Hair!"
1998	Ellen	Himself	Episode: "When Ellen Talks, People Listen"
1998	Pinky, Elmyra & the Brain	Lloyd Oldtire	Voice, episode: "My Fair Brainy"
1999	The Practice	Dr. Foster	Episode: "Day in Court"
1999–2003	7th Heaven	Dr. Hank Hastings	16 episodes
1999, 2009	The Simpsons	Himself	Voice, 2 episodes
2000	Homicide: The Movie	Dr. Victor Ehrlich	Television film
2000	Batman Beyond	Dr. Peter Corso	Voice, episode: "April Moon"
2000	Providence	Chuck Chance	5 episodes
2000	The Michael Richards Show	Impostor Vic	Episode: "The Identity Loan"
2001	The West Wing	Seth Gillette	Episode: "The War at Home"
2001	Hounded	Ward Van Dusen	Television film
2001	Gideon's Crossing	Haley's Father	Episode: "The Crash"
2001	Titus	Bill	Episode: "The Wedding"
2001	Intimate Portrait	Narrator	Voice, episode: "Suzanne Somers"
2001	Family Law	Attorney Ethan Beal	Episode: "Irreparable Harm"
2001–2002	The Agency	Lenny Musgrave	2 episodes
2001–2005	Six Feet Under	Hiram Gunderson	8 episodes
2002	Wednesday 9:30 (8:30 Central)	Paul Weffler	8 episodes
2002	Scrubs	Dr. Bailey	Episode: "My Sacrificial Clam"
2002	Dharma & Greg	Himself	Episode: "Protecting the Ego-System"
2003	War Stories	Ed O'Brian	Television film
2003, 2005	NYPD Blue	—N/a	Directed two episodes
2004	Static Shock	Dr. Donald Todd	Voice, 2 episodes
2004	Life on Liberty Street	Richard Spencer	Television film
2004	Kingdom Hospital	Dr. Jesse James	13 episodes
2004–2005	Jack & Bobby	Rev. Belknap	5 episodes
2005	All Grown Up!	Amish Father	Voice, episode: "R.V. Having Fun Yet?"
2005	Spirit Bear: The Simon Jackson Story	Frank Perdue	Television film
2005	Center of the Universe	Dr. Harrison	Episode: "It's the Principal of the Thing"
2005	Illeanarama	Himself	Episode: "Pilot"
2005–2019	Arrested Development	Stan Sitwell	15 episodes
2006	Three Moons Over Milford	Millionaire	2 episodes
2006	Las Vegas	Mr. Grimaldi	Episode: "Coyote Ugly"
2006–2007	Boston Legal	Clifford Cabot	3 episodes
2006–2007	Veronica Mars	Cyrus O'Dell	6 episodes
2006, 2010	The New Adventures of Old Christine	Pastor Ed	2 episodes
2007–2011	CSI: Miami	Scott O'Shay	5 episodes
2008	The Replacements	Himself	Voice, episode: "Dick Daring's All-Star Holiday Stunt Spectacular"
2008	King of the Hill	Stephens Davies	Voice, episode: "Behind Closed Doors"
2008	Recount	David Boies	Television film
2008	Tim and Eric Awesome Show, Great Job!	Himself	2 episodes
2008–2009	Gary Unmarried	Dr. Walter Krandall	12 episodes
2008–2012	Easy to Assemble	S. Erland Hussen	8 episodes
2009	Hannah Montana	Woody	Episode: "Would I Lie to You, Lilly?"
2009	Party Down	Bruce Nesbitt	Episode: "Pepper McMasters Singles Seminar"
2009	Free Radio	Himself	Episode: "Celebrity"
2009	Curious George	Vinny	Voice, episode: "Curious George, Personal Trainer/Sprout Outing"
2009	Georgia O'Keeffe	Dr. Lee Steiglita	Television film
2009	Monk	Dr. Malcolm Nash	Episode: "Mr. Monk and the End" (Part One)
2009	The Suite Life on Deck	Mayor Ragnar	Episode: "The Swede Life"
2009–2012	Living with Ed	Himself	23 episodes
2010	The Good Guys	Nate Bailey	Episode: "Old Dogs"
2010	Childrens Hospital	Senator Throman	Episode: "You Know No One Can Hear You, Right?"
2010	Outlaw	Judge Donald Crane	2 episodes
2010	Big Time Rush	Himself	2 episodes: "Big Time Live"
2011	$#*! My Dad Says	Terry	Episode: "The Better Father"
2011	Off the Map	Hank	Episode: "On the Mean Streets of San Miguel"
2011	Funny or Die Presents	Double-Chief O'Shambley	Segment: "United States Police Department"
2011	CHAOS	Operative Corwin	Episode: "Molé"
2011–2012	Rizzoli & Isles	Dr. T. Pike	3 episodes
2012	Common Law	Dr. Van Waals	2 episodes
2012	Happy Endings	Himself	Episode: "Meet the Parrots"
2012	Raising Hope	Himself	Episode: "I Want My Baby Back, Baby Back, Baby Back"
2012–2018	Portlandia	Ed, Wes	6 episodes
2013	On Begley Street	Himself	9 episodes
2013	Hot in Cleveland	Yogi	Episode: "Fast and Furious"
2013	Newsreaders	Phillip Breck	Episode: "Unborn Again"
2013	Partners	Dr. Kay	Episode: "Sperm und Drang"
2013	The Office	Martin Hannon	Episode: "Finale"
2013	Rules of Engagement	Reverend Todd	Episode: "100th"
2013	Muhammad Ali's Greatest Fight	Justice Harry Blackmun	Television film
2013	Family Tree	Al Chadwick	5 episodes
2013–2014	Betas	George "Murch" Murchison	7 episodes
2013–2019	Innovations with Ed Begley, Jr.	Himself (host)	Educational documentary series
2014	Regular Show	William	Voice, episode: "Maxin' and Relaxin'"
2015	Your Family or Mine	Gil	5 episodes
2015–2016	Blunt Talk	Teddy	7 episodes
2016–2022	Better Call Saul	Clifford Main	14 episodes
2016	Lopez	Himself	Episode: "Down and Drought in Beverly Hills"
2016	The Bold and the Beautiful	Himself	Episode #1.7387
2016	Bad Internet	Angry Husband	Episode: "Uber, But Like for People"
2016	Angie Tribeca	Bonnie	Episode: "Electoral Dysfunction"
2016	Party Girl	Philip	
2016–2017	Lady Dynamite	Joel Bamford	7 episodes
2017	Grace and Frankie	Mark	Episode: "The Musical"
2017	Future Man	Gabe Futturman	7 episodes
2017–2018	Me, Myself & I	Older Justin	Episode: "The Card"
2017–2020	Curb Your Enthusiasm	Dr. Winocur	2 episodes
2018	Love	Mark Cruikshank	2 episodes
2018	The Cool Kids	Karl	Episode: "Margaret Dates the Zodiac Killer"
2018–2019	Modern Family	Jerry	2 episodes
2019	Bixler High Private Eye	Charlie Dewitt	Television film
2019	Teachers	John-Paul Bennigan	2 episodes
2019–2020	Big City Greens	Mr. Whistler	Voice, 2 episodes
2019–2020	Bless This Mess	Rudolph "Rudy" Longfellow	Main role, 26 episodes
2019–2024	Young Sheldon	Dr. Grant Linkletter	Recurring role, 37 episodes (seasons 2-7)
2020	Our Cartoon President	Bruce Mann	Voice, 2 episodes
2021	SpongeBob SquarePants	Rock T. Puss	Voice, episode: "Goofy Scoopers"
2021–2022	Mr. Mayor	Chet Danville	3 episodes
2022	Queer as Folk	Winston Beaumont	3 episodes
2023	Not Dead Yet	Bill Irving	Episode: "Not Well Yet"
2024	Holiday Touchdown: A Chiefs Love Story	Paul Higman	Christmas television film
2025	Abbott Elementary	Mr. Ronson	Episode: "Game Night"
2026	The Boroughs	Edward	Recurring

== Awards and nominations ==
Year	Award	Category	Nominated work	Result
1983	Primetime Emmy Awards	Outstanding Supporting Actor in a Drama Series	St. Elsewhere	Nominated
1984	Primetime Emmy Awards	Outstanding Supporting Actor in a Drama Series	St. Elsewhere	Nominated
1985	Primetime Emmy Awards	Outstanding Supporting Actor in a Drama Series	St. Elsewhere	Nominated
1986	Primetime Emmy Awards	Outstanding Supporting Actor in a Drama Series	St. Elsewhere	Nominated
1986	Golden Globe Awards	Best Supporting Actor – Series, Miniseries or Television Film	St. Elsewhere	Nominated
1987	Primetime Emmy Awards	Outstanding Supporting Actor in a Drama Series	St. Elsewhere	Nominated
1988	Primetime Emmy Awards	Outstanding Supporting Actor in a Drama Series	St. Elsewhere	Nominated
2004	Florida Film Critics Circle Awards	Best Ensemble Cast	A Mighty Wind	Won
2010	Streamy Awards	Best Ensemble Cast in a Web Series	Easy to Assemble	Won
2019	Primetime Emmy Awards	Outstanding Actor in a Short Form Comedy or Drama Series	Ctrl Alt Delete	Nominated
2023	Screen Actors Guild Awards	Outstanding Performance by an Ensemble in a Drama Series	Better Call Saul	Nominated
