= David Liu =

David Liu may refer to:

- Chung Laung Liu (1934–2020), also known as David Liu, Chinese-born Taiwanese computer scientist
- David Liu (figure skater) (born 1965), Taiwanese figure skater
- David R. Liu (born 1973), American chemist
- David Liu, founder of Jiepang
