= Swarm (app) =

Mobile app by Foursquare

- Developer: Foursquare Labs
- Release: May 5, 2014; 12 years ago

Stable release(s)
- iOS: 7.0.22 / September 5, 2025; 13 months ago
- Android: 7.0.2 / July 17, 2026; 3 months ago
- Platform: iOS, Android
- Available in: 12 languages
- Type: Social networking service
- Website: www.swarmapp.com

Logo from 2014 to 2025

The app's home page before its July 2025 update

Swarm by Foursquare (stylized as swarm) is a mobile app that allows users to share their locations with their friends and create a record of their experiences in a personal lifelog. Swarm launched for iOS and Android devices on May 15, 2014. The app launched as a spin-off from Foursquare City Guide. In 2024, the city guide app was sunsetted.

== Background ==
Swarm allows users to check-in to a given location, and see who is nearby. These check-ins are chronologically listed to create a personal lifelog for each user, which serves as a digital library for all the places they have been, in a searchable database that can be revisited and shared.

Splitting check-ins and general location sharing into the separate Swarm app was designed to let the main Foursquare app focus on exploring and discovering information on locations in a Yelp-like fashion.

Swarm supports checking in with photos or stickers attached and allows broadcasting of check-ins to other social networks, including Facebook and Twitter. Swarm features include a shareable, personalized map; unique stats such as total lifetime check-ins, the number of unique categories visited, and data on streaks and 'mayorships' (a feature of the platform's gamification). Major features include messaging, stickers, challenges,, history search, and merchandise.

== Reception ==
CNET described the app as a "bold move", and praised it for removing some of the "clutter" of Foursquare and focusing on letting the user "quickly see where [their] friends are and make plans". The redesign was unpopular with some existing Foursquare users, who complained about its lack of gamification elements, and the need to download two apps for what used to be contained in a single Foursquare app.
