= PacWind =

PacWind, Inc.
- Company type: Manufacturer
- Founded: 1998
- Headquarters: Torrance, California
- Products: Wind turbines

PacWind, Inc. is a wind turbine manufacturing company based in Torrance, California, United States.

== History ==
The company was founded in 1998, and released their first patented vertical axis wind turbines in May 2006. In 2007, they added another two models of turbines to their product lineup.

In November 2008, certain intellectual property assets of PacWind were acquired by WePOWER, LLC. Since then, the original PacWind website has gone offline, and none of the original turbine designs are available for sale. The WePOWER product lineup as of the end of 2009 were the Falcon series turbines ranging from 600W to 12 kW.

== Notable installations ==
On May 17, 2007, PacWind gained a large amount of publicity when TV personality Jay Leno announced that, as part of an ongoing project with Popular Mechanics, he would be having one of the 'Delta II' (10 kW) model turbines installed on the roof of his garage.

During the "I Spy Bill Nye" episode of Living With Ed, Ed Begley, Jr. has a 'SeaHawk' (500w) model turbine installed on the roof of his house.

Sixteen of PacWind's turbines were used in the design of the first eco-friendly billboard in Times Square in 2008.
