= Foursquare (company) =

American technology company

Foursquare Labs Inc.
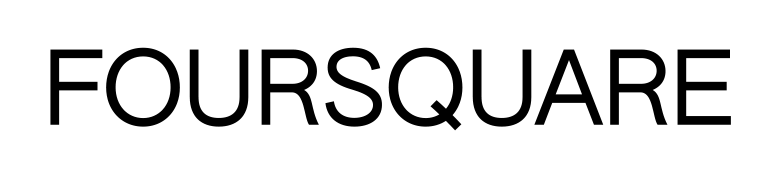
- Type: Private
- Industry: Location technology; Advertising technology; App developer tools
- Founded: March 11, 2009; 17 years ago in New York, New York, U.S.
- Founders: Dennis Crowley; Naveen Selvadurai
- Headquarters: New York City, New York, United States
- Area served: Worldwide
- Key people: Gary Little, CEO; Dennis Crowley
- Number of employees: Approximately 150
- Website: location.foursquare.com

Foursquare Labs Inc., commonly known as Foursquare, is an American geolocation technology company and data cloud platform based in the United States. Founded by Dennis Crowley and Naveen Selvadurai in 2009, the company rose to prominence with the launch of its local search-and-discovery mobile app. The app, Foursquare City Guide, popularized the concept of real-time location sharing and checking-in.

Alongside additions and iterations to its consumer apps, the company also began to create products that leverage the location data collected via billions of check-ins.

== History ==
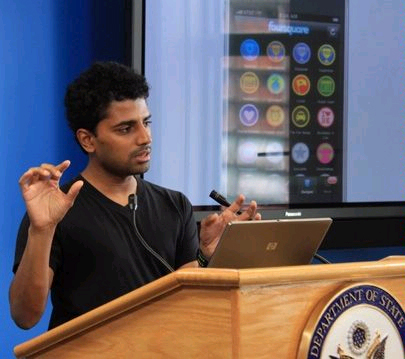
Naveen Selvadurai, co-founder of Foursquare

=== Launch and early years ===
Co-founders Dennis Crowley and Naveen Selvadurai founded Foursquare in 2008 and launched Foursquare City Guide in 2009 at SXSW. Crowley had previously founded the similar project Dodgeball as his graduate thesis project in the Interactive Telecommunications Program (ITP) at New York University and subsequently sold it to Google in 2005.

In November 2009, Foursquare opened up access to its API, enabling developers to access data generated by the Foursquare app and build applications on top of that data. Foursquare opened its second office, in San Francisco, the next year, shortly after reaching one million users. In 2011, Foursquare began working on Pilgrim SDK, the core technology that combines stop-detection and snap-to-place functions in order to provide contextual awareness to Foursquare's apps. As of January 31, 2023, Foursquare renamed its Pilgrim SDK product to Movement SDK.

=== Swarm release ===
In May 2014, the company launched Swarm, a companion app to Foursquare City Guide, that moved the social networking and location sharing aspects of the service to a separate application. In August 2014, the company launched Foursquare 8.0, a completely new version of the service that shifted the focus from check-ins to focus on local search and recommendations.

=== 2015 to present ===
In April 2015, Foursquare began offering location-based enterprise products for marketers and advertisers with the launch of Pinpoint. The company subsequently released Attribution, a tool for media performance measurement, in February 2016, and the Movement (FKA Pilgrim) software development kit, which allows developers to use Foursquare's core Movement technology to add context into their own apps and services, in March 2017. Each of these tools can be used independently, or they can be bundled together.

On January 14, 2016, co-founder Dennis Crowley stepped down from his position as CEO. He moved to an Executive Chairman position while Jeff Glueck, the company's COO, succeeded Crowley as the new CEO.

In 2017, Foursquare announced its expansion in the Asia-Pacific region with partners like Tencent and Samsung, and a new office in Singapore. Over the course of the three-year period from 2015 through 2017, the company's revenue grew by more than 50% each year. In early 2018, Foursquare opened a new engineering office in Chicago.

In May 2019, Foursquare bought Placed from Snap Inc.

On December 6, 2019, Foursquare's Board of Directors announced the appointment of David Shim as Chief Executive Officer and Member of the Board.

In April 2020, Foursquare announced a merger with Factual Inc. in an all-stock deal.

On November 5, 2020 it was announced that David Shim was stepping down as Chief Executive Officer, to be replaced by Gary Little, a member of the company's board.

On May 20, 2021, Foursquare announced an agreement to acquire Unfolded, a next-generation platform for geospatial data unification, enrichment, visualization, and analytics to help solidify the company's location, geospatial technology, and developer community. Unfolded has been renamed to Foursquare Studio.

In February 2022, Foursquare launched Hex Tiles, a tiling system that maximizes the speed and efficiency of data analytics for businesses looking to perform large-scale geospatial analytics for decision-making purposes.

In May 2023, the company launched Foursquare Graph, a geospatial knowledge graph designed to improve how businesses derive value from location data through the use of graph technology and the H3 grid system.

In May 2024, Foursquare laid off 105 employees, approximately 25% of its workforce.

In September 2026, Foursquare was acquired by Infillion, an advertising agency which said it will "evaluate the future of Foursquare's consumer applications." When asked by an avid user of Foursquare's flagship and only well-known app, Swarm, the ad agency's CEO stated, "We don't have anything to announce today on it."

On September 18, 2026, advertising technology company Infillion announced that it would acquire Foursquare in its entirety; financial terms were not disclosed. Infillion said Foursquare would continue to operate as an independent brand and to sell its data to third-party customers, and that most of Foursquare's roughly 150 employees would join Infillion. Chief executive Gary Little would not join the combined company. Infillion said it would evaluate the future of Foursquare's consumer apps, Swarm and Superlocal, with options including open-source models and strategic partnerships.

On October 20, 2026, former Co-founder Dennis Crowley publicly commented on Foursquare's acquisition. In a Substack post, he expressed regret that the company's acquisition resulted in "a $0 outcome for equity holders", and said he was heartbroken by the result. He also highlighted that following the appointment of former CEO Gary Little the company was unable to sustain revenue, which fell from a high of $200m+ in 2021, and highlighted employees' criticism on Glassdoor.

=== Funding ===
Foursquare is principally funded by Union Square Ventures, Andreessen Horowitz, O'Reilly AlphaTech Ventures, DFJ Growth, Morgan Stanley Alternative Investment Partners, Spark Capital, and more. The company raised $1.35 million in its Series A round and $20 million in its Series B round. On June 24, 2011, Foursquare raised $50 million on a $600 million valuation. Their Series D round funding of $35 million was announced on December 19, 2013 and led by DFJ Growth.

In January 2016, the company raised $45 million in a series E funding round led by Union Square Ventures. Morgan Stanley participated along with previous investors: DFJ Growth, Andreessen Horowitz and Spark Capital. In October 2018, the company announced that it raised an additional $33 million in a series F funding round co-led by investors Simon Ventures and Naver, in addition to longstanding investor Union Square Ventures.

== Consumer apps ==
=== Foursquare City Guide ===
Launched in March 2009, Foursquare City Guide is a local search and discovery mobile app that helps users discover new places from a community of peers. The app provides personalized recommendations of places to go near a user's current location based on the user's previous visits, likes and check-in history. The Foursquare City Guide mobile app was officially sunset on December 15, 2024, and the web version followed on April 28, 2025.

=== Foursquare Swarm ===
In May 2014, the company launched Foursquare Swarm, a companion app to Foursquare City Guide, which migrated the social networking and location sharing aspects of the service into a separate application. Swarm acts as a lifelogging tool for users to keep a record of the places they have been, featuring statistics on the places they have been, and a search capability to recall places where they have checked in. Swarm also lets users share where they have been with their friends, and see where their friends have been.

In September 2026, advertising technology company Infillion announced that it would acquire Foursquare Labs. Infillion said it would evaluate the future of Swarm, with options including open-source models and strategic partnerships, and said it had nothing to announce yet about the app's plans. Foursquare uses Swarm's first-party check-in data to help verify other location datasets.

=== Rewards by Foursquare ===
In August 2021, the company relaunched Rewards, previously Foursquare’s Panel App. The app gave users the opportunity to earn points to be redeemed for gift cards in exchange for enabling background location services. The app was sunset in May 2023.

=== Marsbot ===
Launched in May 2016, Marsbot was a location-aware tool that sent context-based suggestions about nearby places to eat and drink via text, tailored to users' preferences. In October 2020, Foursquare introduced an audio AR version for AirPods called Marsbot for AirPods, which provided location-specific guidance through users' bluetooth headphones. Marsbot was sunset in 2021.

=== Superlocal ===
In April 2025, the company acquired Superlocal, a map app built on Foursquare’s geospatial platform. Superlocal automatically logs users' locations and uses that data to provide personalized recommendations on where to go next. Its key features include Fog of World, where users reveal a fog-covered map layer to track the percentage of the Earth they've visited, and automatic check-ins. These lifelogging features then power the app’s AI-driven search functionality.

== Products and technology ==
=== Foursquare Graph ===
Foursquare Graph is a knowledge graph that organizes disparate geospatial datasets to derive business insights. The use of graph technology introduced a time-aware dimension to all geospatial datasets, facilitating spatiotemporal analyses. Launched in May 2023, it was designed to unify Foursquare’s product suite and utilize the H3 grid system in order to minimize the time and resources necessary to extract business insights from location-based queries.

=== Foursquare Places ===
Foursquare Places is a database of venue information representing 120+ million commercial points-of-interest (POI) across 200+ countries and territories. Foursquare maintains the Places database and updates the data in real time through a combination of first-party data, third-party data, and its Geosummarizer ML model. The Foursquare Places API enables developers to integrate location-aware capabilities directly into their apps for services such as delivery, navigation, ride-share, and shopping.

=== Foursquare Studio ===
Foursquare Studio is a geospatial visualization and analytics platform. Foursquare Studio allows users to join large-scale data of diverse shapes and sizes for analysis through the creation, design, and sharing of interactive maps.

=== Hex Tiles ===
Hex Tiles is Foursquare’s proprietary analytical tiling system that utilizes the H3 global grid system to allow users to quickly process and unify large amounts of geospatial and temporal data for advanced analysis and exploration.

=== Movement SDK ===
First launched as Pilgrim SDK in 2011, Movement SDK combines stop-detection and snap-to-place functions in order to provide contextual awareness to apps, using machine learning models that combine first-party GPS, Cell, Wifi, Bluetooth, Accelerometer, and time-of-day data.

== Patents ==
Foursquare holds more than 80 patents related to geolocation technology. Notable patents including the following.

=== System and Method for Providing Recommendations with a Location-Based Service ===
This patent describes a mobile application that offers intelligent venue recommendations based on a user's location history, as well as preferences of their social network and individuals with similar tastes. U.S. patent 8,775,351

=== Analyzing Impact of Ad Campaign on in-Store Visitation Behavior ===
A system and method for attributing in-store visits to exposure to advertisement (“ad”) impressions associated with an ad campaign are disclosed. U.S. patent 11,734,712

=== Taste Extraction Curation and Tagging ===
This patent involves generating taste data for entities within apps, where curated taste candidates are determined based on app information. User feedback is used to approve or reject candidates, generating taste data that can include descriptors and recommendations. U.S. patent 10,614,138

=== Apparatus, Systems, and Methods for Providing Location Information ===
This patent focuses on an efficient location query mechanism. By representing regions of interest with polygons and dividing them into sub-polygons, the mechanism builds an index system for quick determination of whether a given location falls within any sub-polygon, enabling rapid location-based queries. U.S. patent 9,753,965
