= Google Latitude =

Location-aware feature of Google Maps

- Website type: Social network, Location-based service
- Available in: Multilingual
- Dissolved: August 9, 2013; 13 years ago
- Predecessor: Dodgeball
- Owner: Google
- Website: latitude.google.com (defunct)
- Commercial: Yes
- Registration: Required
- Launched: February 5, 2009; 17 years ago
- Current status: Discontinued

Google Latitude was a location-aware feature of Google Maps, developed by Google as a successor to its earlier SMS-based service Dodgeball. Latitude allowed a mobile phone user to share their current location with certain people. Via their own Google Account, the user's cell phone location was mapped on Google Maps. The user could control the accuracy and details of what each other user can see — an exact location could be allowed, or it could be limited to identifying only the city. For privacy, the user can also turn it off or manually enter a location. Users had to explicitly opt in to Latitude and could only see the locations of friends who had chosen to share their locations.

On July 10, 2013, Google announced plans to shut down Latitude, and it was discontinued on August 9, 2013. After the feature moved to Google+ in between, Google incorporated Latitude's location sharing feature into Google Maps in March 2017.

== History ==
=== Dodgeball ===
Dodgeball was founded in 2000 by New York University students Dennis Crowley and Alex Rainert. The company was acquired by Google in 2005, and Crowley and Rainert were hired as Google employees, which led to the coinage of the term acquihire. In April 2007, Crowley and Rainert left Google, with Crowley describing their experience there as "incredibly frustrating". After leaving Google, Crowley created a similar service known as Foursquare with the help of Naveen Selvadurai.

Dodgeball offered users a facility via SMS. Dodgeball was available for the cities of Seattle, Portland, San Francisco, Los Angeles, Las Vegas, San Diego, Phoenix, Dallas–Fort Worth, Austin, Houston, New Orleans, Miami, Atlanta, Washington, D.C., Philadelphia, New York City, Boston, Detroit, Chicago, Madison, Minneapolis–St. Paul and Denver.

In January 2009, Vic Gundotra, Vice President of Engineering at Google, announced that the company would "discontinue Dodgeball.com in the next couple of months, after which this service will no longer be available." Dodgeball was shut down and succeeded in February 2009 by Google Latitude.

=== Latitude ===
With Google Latitude, the service expanded to PC browsers (it used the Geolocation API as well as user-driven input) and automated location detection on mobile phones using cellular positioning, Wi-Fi positioning, and GPS.

In November 2009, Google announced a Latitude feature called "Location History" which stores and analyzes a user's location over time, for example attempting to identify a user's home and workplace. Web-based Location History is now provided by Google Maps.

In May 2010, Google announced an API for Latitude for developers to incorporate Latitude functionality into their apps. The functionality was "opt in" and had to be enabled by users due to the sensitivity of location data. Users had the ability to share their exact location, a more general city-level location, or even share a location as a destination.

In February 2012, a Leaderboard feature was added that provides point scoring and score comparison with friends.

== Discontinuation ==
On July 10, 2013, Google announced plans to shut down Google Latitude on August 9, 2013. Google then offered location reporting on Google+, with Latitude's functionality fully migrated into Google Maps in 2018.

== Compatibility ==
Google Latitude was compatible with most devices running iOS, Android, BlackBerry OS, Windows Mobile, and Symbian S60. Google stated on the Latitude page that it would be available for Java ME phones,, but this claim was later removed from the site. On most platforms, Latitude could continue updating the user's location in the background when the application was not in use, whereas on others, it only updated the user's location when the application was in use.

The Sony Ericsson W995, C905, C903, C510, Elm, and Satio mobile phones supported Google Latitude via their built-in Google Maps applications.

== Privacy concerns ==
Amid concerns over locational privacy, Google announced that Latitude overwrites a user's previous location with the new location data and does not keep logs of locations provided to the service. It also reflected to whom the location was shared and can be traced 24/7.

By early 2011, Google Latitude optionally recorded a history of visited places and tracked the time spent at each. This information was then used to display statistics such as "Time At Work", "Time Spent At Home", and "Time Spent Out".

== See also ==
- Location-based service
- Find My Friends
- Life360
