= Check-in =

Announcement of an arrival

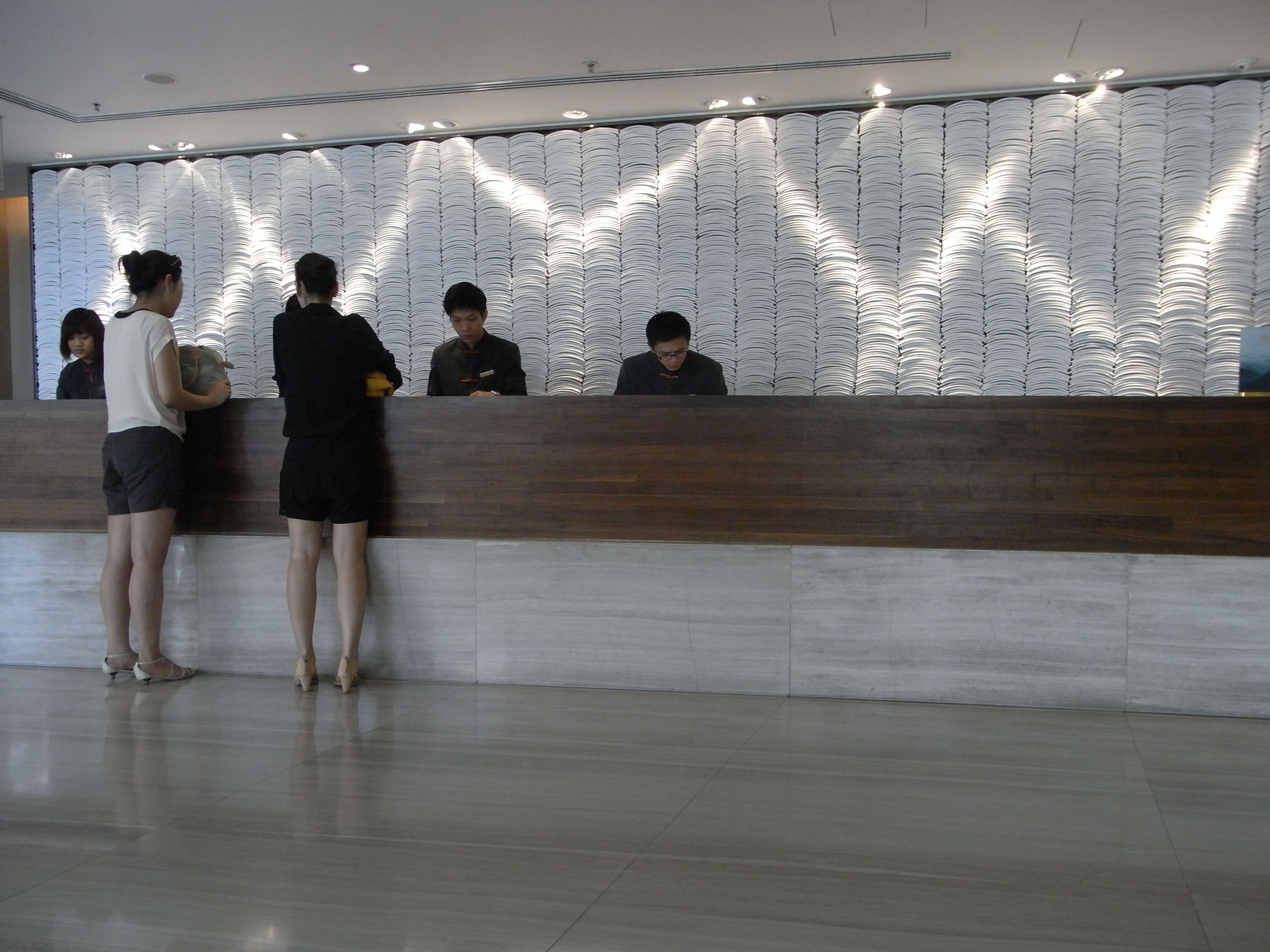
Check-in counter at a hotel in Hong Kong

Check-in is the process whereby people announce their arrival at an office, hotel, airport, hospital, seaport or event.

== Office check-in ==
Many offices have a reception or front office area near the entrance to greet or assist visitors arriving to attend a meeting. A receptionist may ask visitors who they are to meet and may ask them to sign a register. The receptionist may give a visitor instructions as to where to go or inform the host that his guest has arrived. The visitor may be issued with a visible visitor’s pass, often worn around the neck.

Research shows that long waiting times at the reception area could lead to loss of customers.

COVID-19 has led organisations to wider and faster adoption of technology to streamline the visitor check-in process, Visitor management systems automate the visitor check in process and reduces office check-in time with pre-registering visitors through email, effective communication, QR code express check-in, automate host notifications and efficient visitor management workflows.

== Airport check-in ==
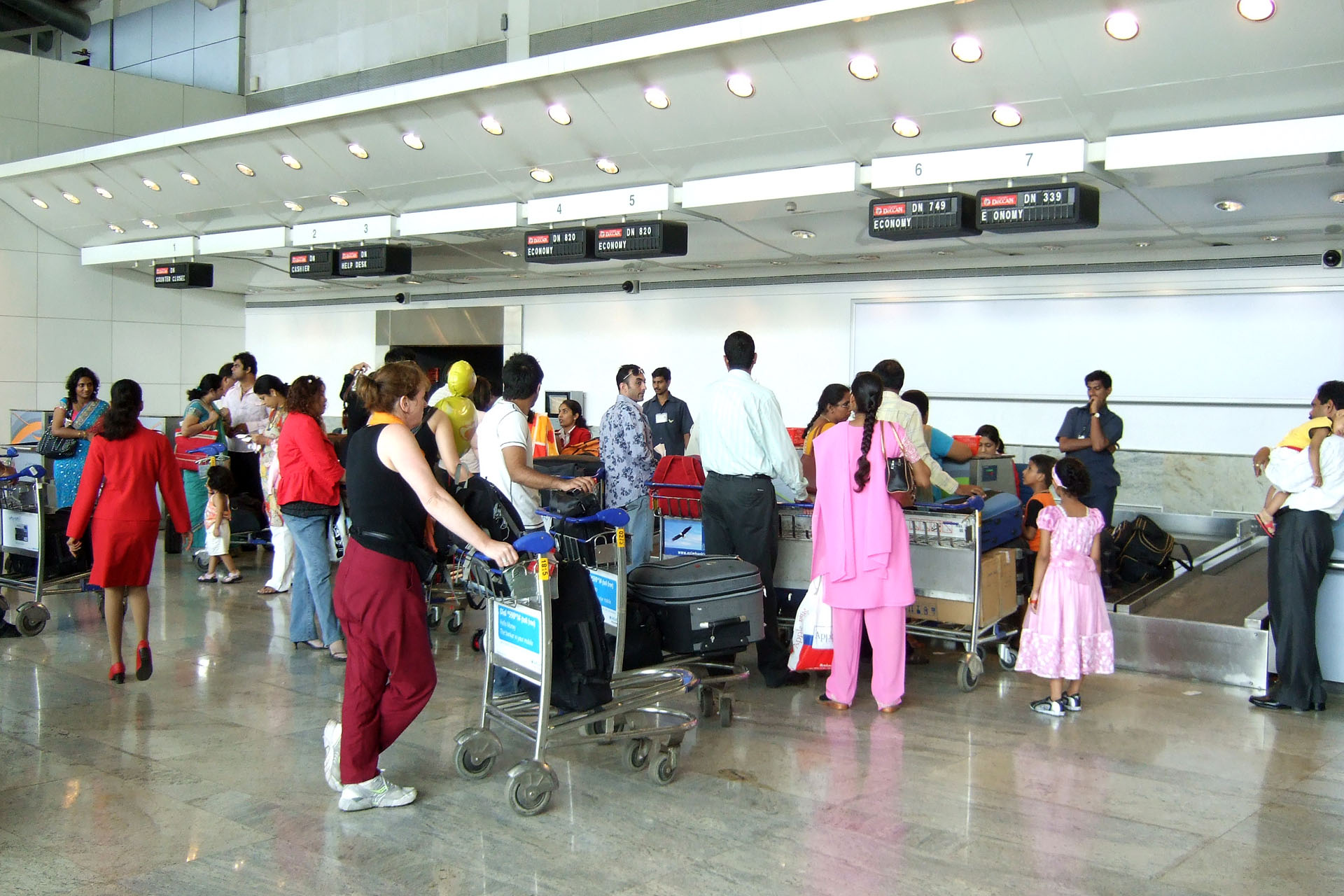
Check-in at Mumbai International Airport (domestic terminal)

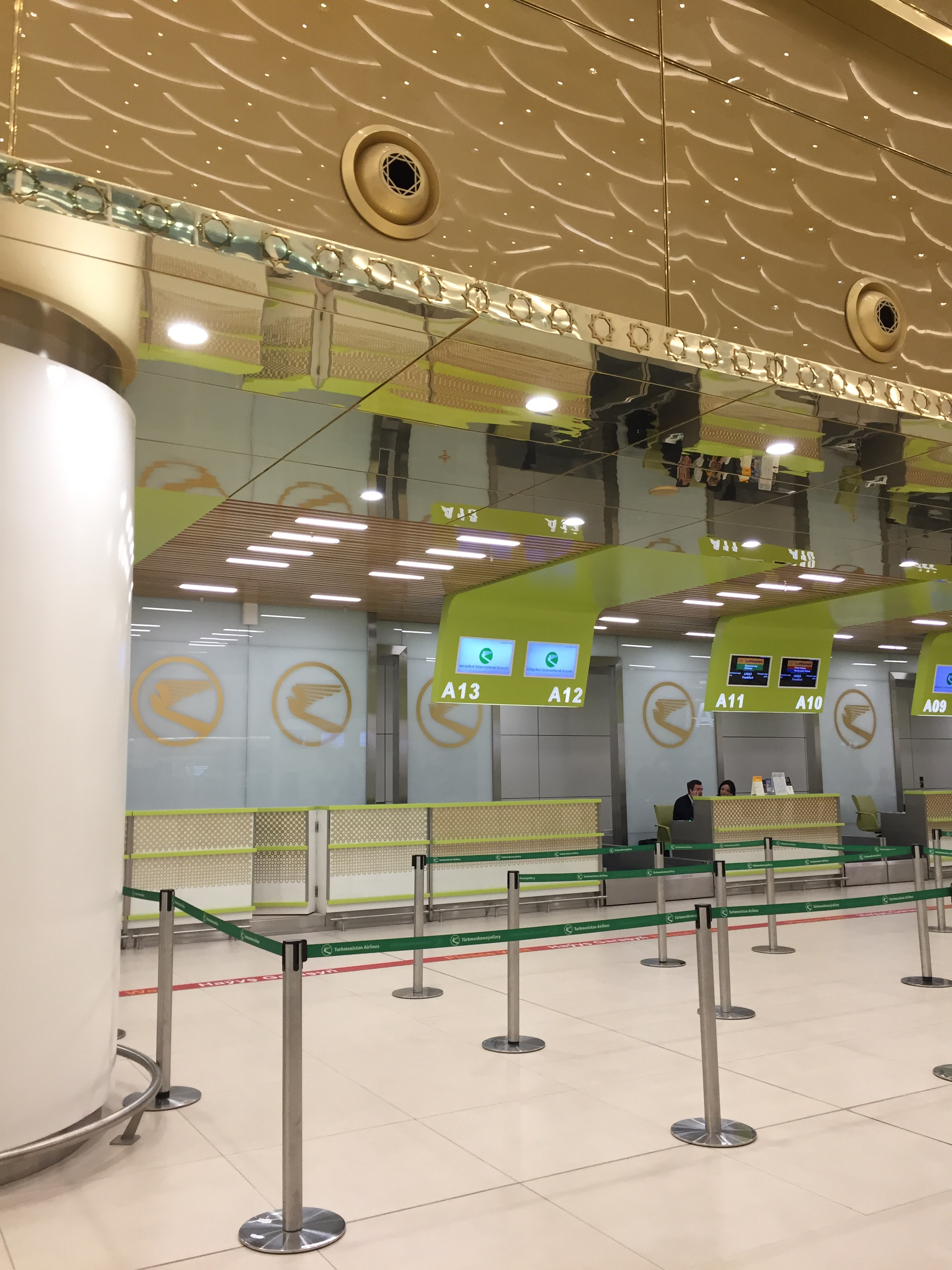
Aşgabat International Airport check-in area

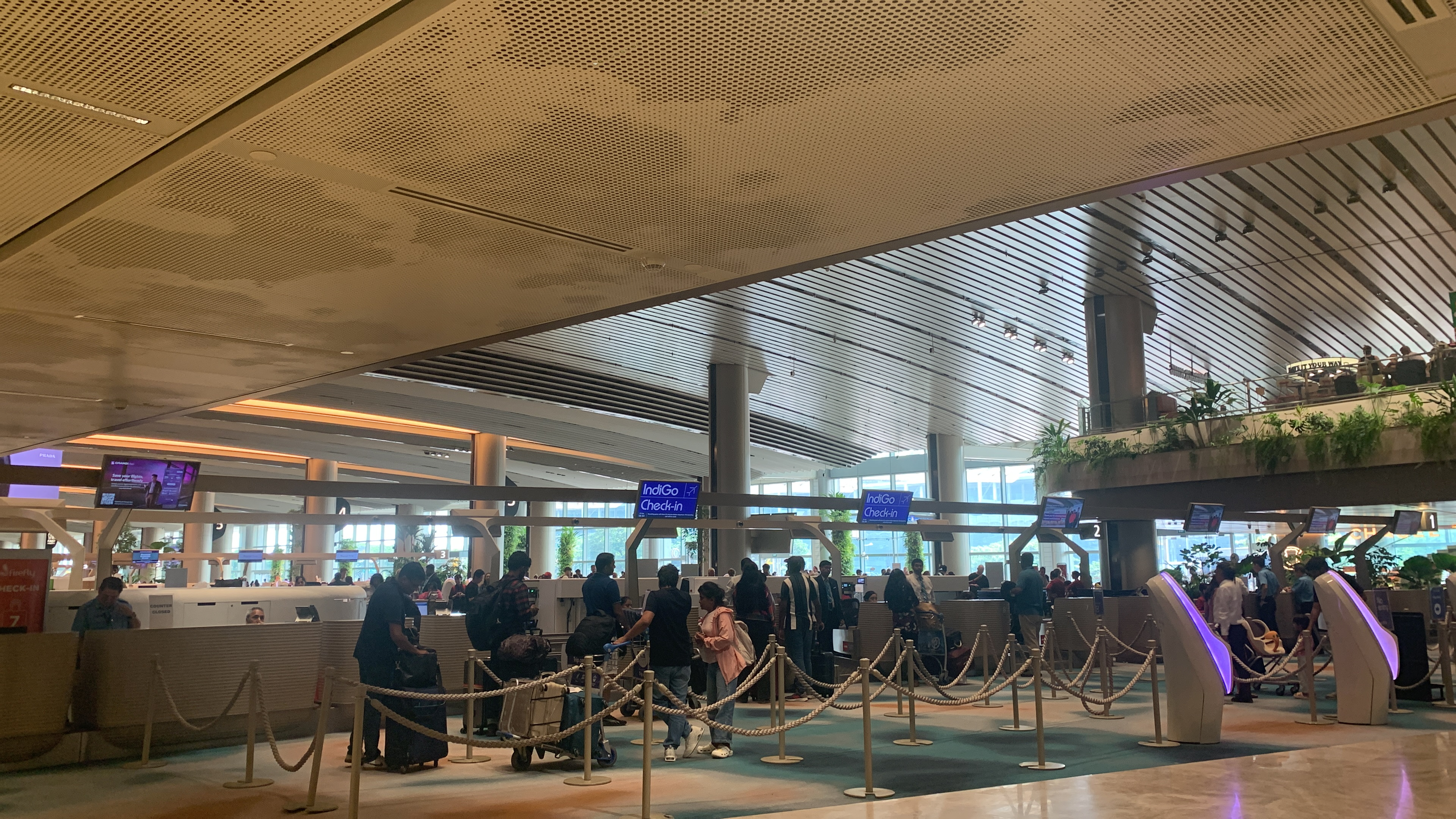
Changi International Airport check-in area (Terminal 2)

The check-in process at airports enables passengers to check-in luggage onto a plane and to obtain a boarding pass. When presenting at the check-in counter, a passenger will provide evidence of the right to travel, such as a ticket, visa or electronic means. Each airline provides facilities for passengers to check-in their luggage, except for their carry-on (also called cabin) bags. This may be by way of airline-employed staff at check-in counters at airports or through an agency arrangement or by way of a self-service kiosk. The luggage is weighed and tagged, and then placed on a conveyor that usually feeds the luggage into the main baggage handling system. The luggage goes into the aircraft's cargo hold. The check-in staff then issues each passenger with a boarding pass.

There is an increasing trend towards more streamlined checking-in processes, whereby passengers can bypass or reduce the time in queues at the staffed check-in counters. This may involve passengers checking in online before arriving at the airport or using an airline's self-service check-in kiosks at the airport. Some airports have a curbside check-in, where passengers can check in their bags to an airline representative before entering the terminal and then proceeding directly to security.

Many airlines have a deadline for passengers to check in before each flight. This is to allow the airline to offer unclaimed seats to stand-by passengers, to load luggage onto the plane and to finalize documentation for take-off. The passenger must also take into account the time that may be needed for them to clear the check-in line, to pass security and then to walk (sometimes also to ride) from the check-in area to the boarding area. This may take several hours at some airports or at some times of the year. On international flights, additional time would be required for immigration and customs clearance.

== Hotels ==
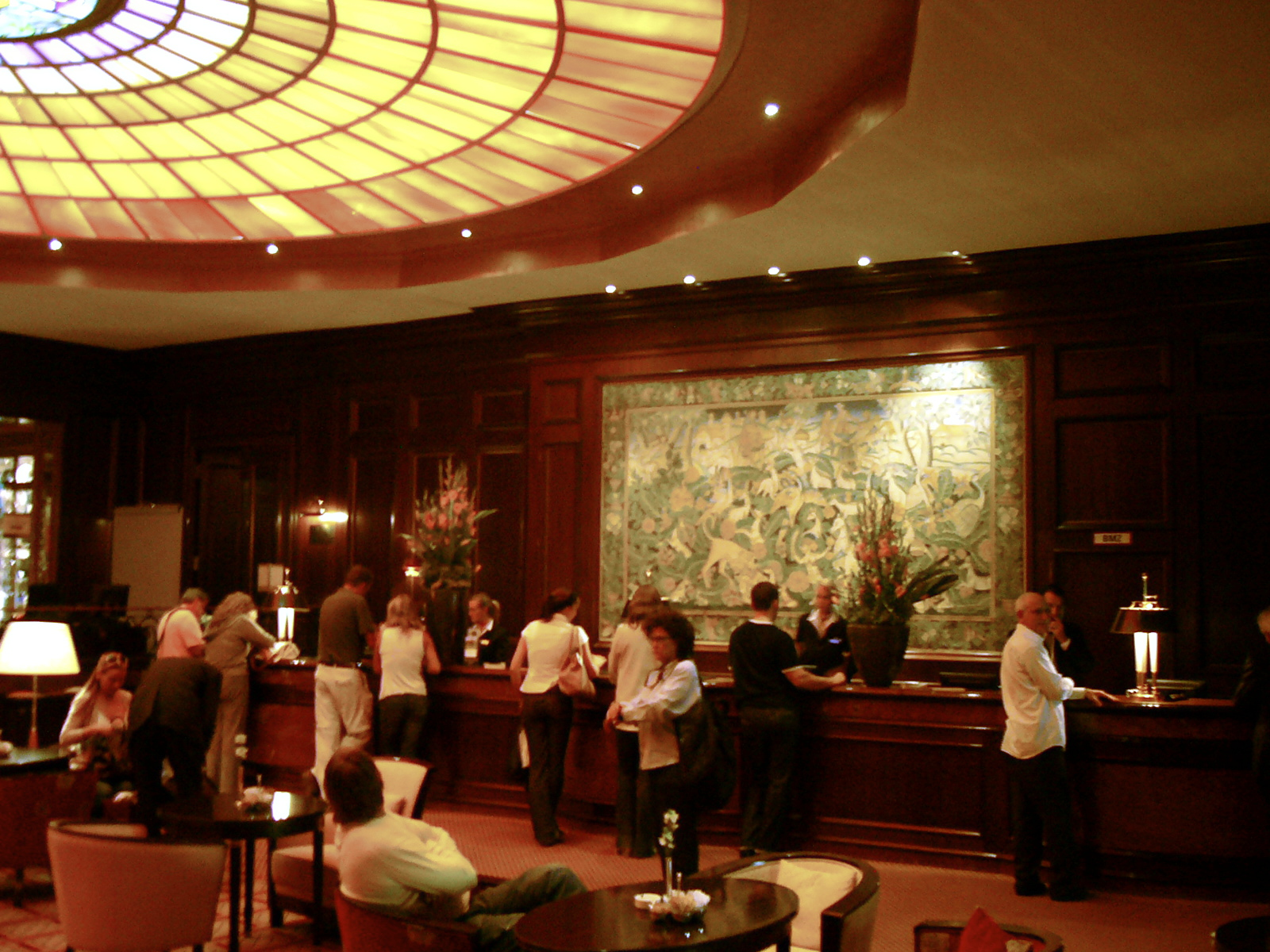
Kempinski Hotel Vier Jahreszeiten check-in

Hotels and similar establishments usually require guests to check in (also called registering or signing in), which involves the guest providing or confirming personal information, including contact information, along with a signature. The laws of some countries require guests to provide this information and to sign a register, often called a hotel register or guestbook, which may be in the form of a registration card, and some also require the provision of identification documents, such as a passport, national identity card or drivers licence which the hotel may wish to copy and retain in its records. Usually, only one guest is required to register per room. Sometimes, the register may need to be provided to a government agency, such as the local police, and sometimes with a court warrant or similar authority.

The establishment may require guests to provide a credit card or a security deposit as a guarantee to cover potential costs such as the use of room service or a mini-bar for the duration of the stay, and to facilitate a more expedient check-out process at the end of the guest's stay. At the end of the checking in process, the reception staff will provide guests with a room key. More and more hotels are implementing online or contactless check-in options.

Check-in times vary, but can range from about 12 pm to about 3 pm, depending on the establishment's rules and regulations. Late check-ins can be arranged through the hotel as long as the guests book this in advance and arrange all the necessary details. Hotels usually specify a check-in time after which they expect guests to check in. If a guest wants to occupy a hotel room before the hotel's check-in time, some hotels may charge for an additional day or treat it as a previous day's stay (as compared to occupying the hotel room after the check-in time). Most hotels, however, allow a grace time (typically 30–60 minutes) upon request by a guest, without any additional charge, if a guest wishes to have access to the room before the check-in time. Some hotels also have a latest check-in time, often 6 pm – 8 pm, after which they may give a room to someone else if the room has not been prepaid for or the guest does not phone in to indicate their expected time of arrival. Some hotels have a deadline for checking in because the reception desk may close for the night. For the most cost-effective usage of hotel room occupancy, a guest should try to arrive near a hotel's check-in time and leave or hand over the hotel room near the hotel's check-out time. However, doing so may not always be practical because, for example, a guest's flight arrival and departure times or car trips may not align with a hotel's check-in and check-out times.

== Social network ==
Many social networking services, such as Foursquare, Google+, Facebook, Jiepang, VK, GetGlue, and Gowalla, as well as Google Latitude (closed), and Brightkite (closed) in the past, allow users to what has been referred to as self-reported positioning, or more commonly known as a "check-in", to a physical place and share their locations with their friends.

Users can check in to a specific location by text messaging or by using a mobile application on a smartphone—the application will use the phone's GPS to find the current location.

Many applications have a “Places” button or tab where a user can see a list of nearby places into which the user can check in. If a location is not on the nearby places list, the user can add the location directly from the phone. Once users have checked in, they have the option of sharing their location with friends in services such as Twitter or Facebook.
