= Jiepang =

Chinese social networking service

Jiepang 街旁
- Company type: Private
- Website type: Social networking service
- Available in: Chinese (simplified, traditional)
- Headquarters: Beijing, China
- Founder: David Liu
- CEO: David Liu
- Website: jiepang.com
- Registration: Required
- Users: 5,000,000
- Launched: May 13, 2010
- Current status: Defunct

Jiepang (Chinese: 街旁; pinyin: Jiēpáng) was a Chinese social networking service for mobile devices, such as smartphones. Users can download the Jiepang app to track and share life moments with friends. In July 2013, Jiepang launched an all new design in version 5.0, which evolved from its origins as China's leading location-based service (LBS) for the "check in". Jiepang helps users record and track all of their life activities, connect with friends in specific moments and explore communities of people that have similar interests.

In the past, Jiepang was highly similar to Foursquare and was frequently called the Foursquare of China. But the redesign of Jiepang 5.0 pivots the app away from that reference.

The service was created in 2010 by David Liu (刘大卫), and is available in simplified and traditional Chinese characters as well as English. As of July 2013, it had 5 million users.

As of June 20, 2016, the app and website are no longer working.

== Features ==
Jiepang provides an application for iOS, Android, and a mobile website.

Jiepang homepage has an easy access check-in toolbar that allows users to post their location, tag friends they are with, share a photo and add comments ("check-in"). Users can choose to have their moments synced to their other social-network accounts on Sina Weibo, Renren, Douban, Qzone, Tencent Weibo, Kaixin001, Fanfou, and Twitter. Each post can also be synced to WeChat moments or individual WeChat conversations.

Users can create a "To Do" list for their private use and add "Tips" to venues that other users can read, which serve as suggestions for great things to do, see or eat at the location.

In addition, users can view their personal page to view history chronologically, by photos, etc.

=== Activity Tags ===
Jiepang 5.0 launched 16 activity tags: Food, Coffee, KTV, Movies, Date, Travel, Shopping, Party, Work, Exercise, Drink, Performance, Pets, Sleepless, Selfie, and Mock/Vent. Activity tags help users categorize personal posts to easily reflect on specific moments. Activity tags also allow users to explore their interests by viewing other users' posts within specific categories. Users have the choice of adding one activity tag to each post. Within each activity tag category, users can view all posts shared by friends or explore those from within the whole Jiepang community.

=== Badges ===
Badges (Chinese: 徽章; pinyin: huīzhāng) are earned by participating in campaigns via checking into venues with specific hashtags, using a branded photo filter, check-in frequency, time of check-in, etc. Once a badge is earned by a player, it will remain on that user's profile indefinitely.

=== Specials ===
"Specials" (Chinese: 惊喜; pinyin: jīngxǐ), are incentives for Jiepang users to record specific moments.

== Partnerships ==
Jiepang has partnered with over 400 global brands, including Starbucks, Louis Vuitton., Neutrogena, Listerine, McDonald's, Starwood Hotels, etc.
