= Infillion =

American digital advertising company

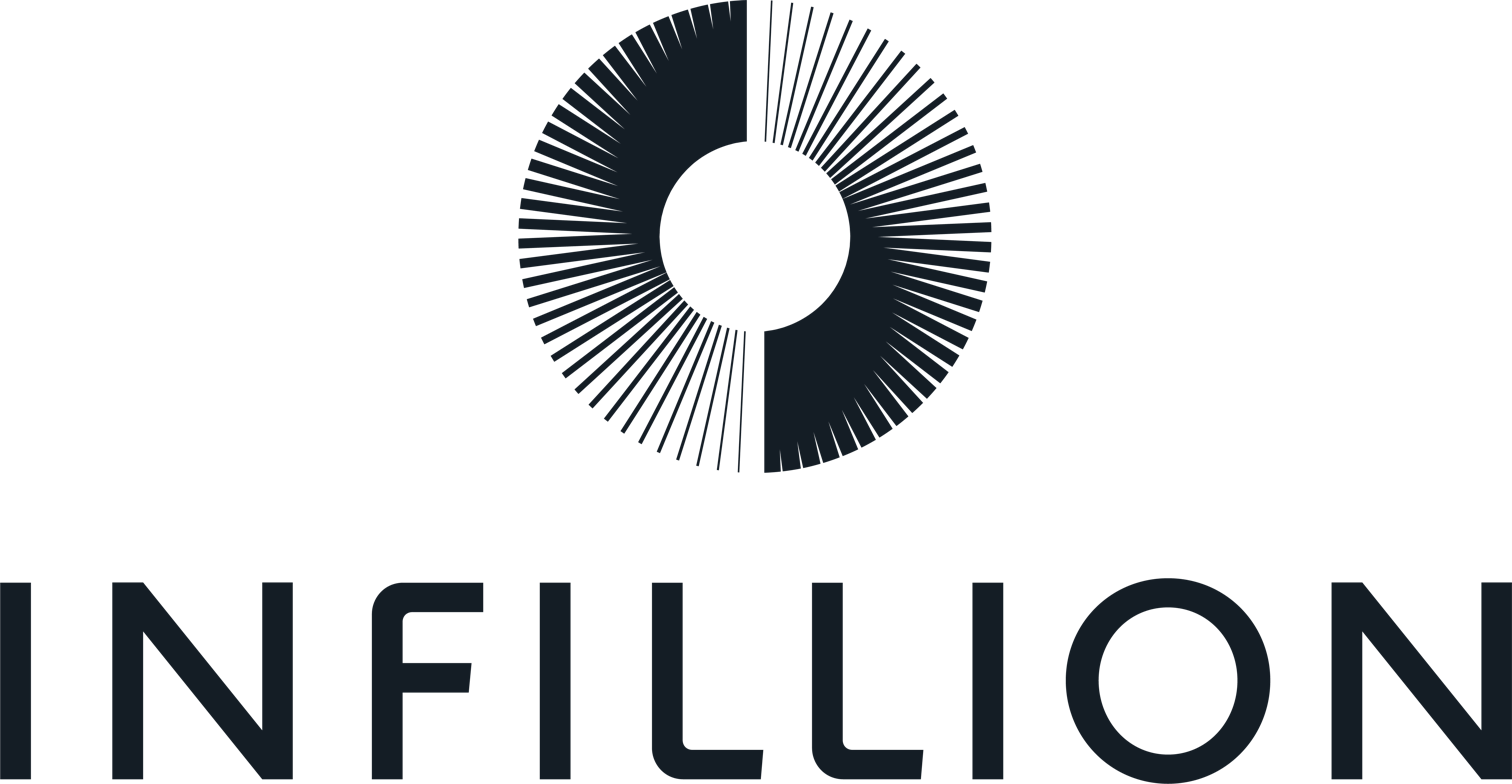
- Formerly: SocialVibe (2007–2013); true[X] (2013-2022); Gimbal | true[X] (2022)
- Type: Subsidiary
- Industry: Online advertising
- Founded: 2007; 19 years ago
- Founders: Joe Marchese; Brandon Mills; David Levy; Rob Emrich
- Headquarters: Los Angeles, California; New York City, New York
- Key people: RJ Nicolosi (President & COO); Rob Emrich (Executive Chair)
- Services: Engagement advertising, Media, Advertising technology
- Number of employees: 30–50
- Website: www.infillion.com

Infillion, formerly known as Gimbal | true[X], TrueX, Inc. (stylized as true[X]) and SocialVibe, is an American digital advertising company founded in 2007 by Joe Marchese, Brandon Mills and David Levy. The company is headquartered in Los Angeles and New York City. It was previously owned by 21st Century Fox, from 2014 until Disney's acquisition of 21st Century Fox in 2019, and The Walt Disney Company from 2019 until 2020.

== History ==
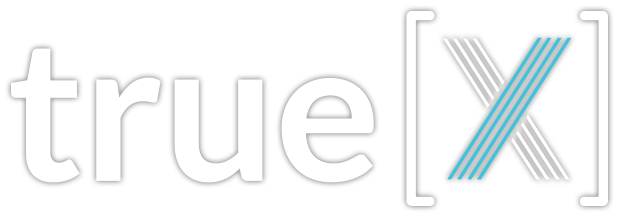
The TrueX logo before being rebranded as Infillion

The company that would eventually become Infillion was founded as SocialVibe in 2006. SocialVibe originally enabled customers to raise money for social causes they wished to support. In December 2007, it received $4.2 million in Series A funding led by Redpoint Ventures. It was launched into public beta in February 2008.

In January 2009, Jafco Ventures led an initiative along with Redpoint Ventures to raise the total amount invested in the company to $12 million, as the company shifted to a model in which it shared revenue with the charities it represented. In March 2011, SocialVibe closed a $20 million round of funding led by Norwest Venture Partners. By this point, SocialVibe had expanded into online and mobile advertising, including running ad campaigns within Zynga games on Facebook. In 2013 the company became known as TrueX. Between 2013 and 2014, the company doubled its revenue. In May 2014, the company received an additional $6 million in funding. Later that year, it was acquired by 21st Century Fox in a deal worth $200 million. One of Fox's first moves after buying the company was utilizing TrueX technology that gave viewers using web browsers and connected TV apps a choice to watch a single interactive ad at the beginning of a piece of video content, or to have that content interrupted by regular commercial breaks.

In September 2017, The Walt Disney Company assumed control of TrueX as part of its $71 billion purchase of 21st Century Fox. On March 17, 2020, Disney announced that it was looking to sell TrueX, as Disney considered it a non-core brand that was not a part of Disney's sales or technology divisions. Disney announced that TrueX had been sold to the marketing data company Gimbal, Inc. on September 28, 2020.

Following the sale of TrueX to Gimbal, the two companies became a single entity known as Gimbal/TrueX. On March 1, 2022, Gimbal/TrueX rebranded as Infillion.

In September 2023, it was announced Infillion had acquired the New York-headquartered advertising technology company, MediaMath.

== Products and services ==
Engagement advertising

Infillion has worked with Microsoft, Visa, Apple, Disney, Coca-Cola, Kia Motors, Kraft Foods, Macy's, Nestlé, Procter & Gamble and Discover Card on online advertisements. The company delivers ad units that are self-selected by the viewer in exchange for access to online content such as videos, music, games, or more articles. The ads take over the browser of a user's computer for about 30 seconds, and require user participation for completion. Infillion quantifies consumer engagement using metrics like video views, submitted survey forms, and social media likes, so that marketers pay more or less for ads depending on how much engagement they generate. Infillion is also a source of ad inventory for text and visual ads. The company has provided ad space to publishers such as Tribune Company, AT&T, and Pandora Radio. These ads are distributed programmatically. Their engagement-based nature is intended to reduce instances of ad fraud.

Location services and out-of-home advertising

Infillion is a provider of consumer location data, which is typically used for mobile ad targeting. In 2016, Infillion partnered with Citibank to provide services to 60,000 Citi Mobile app users based on their location. For instance, users could unlock ATM lobby doors with their phones, without swiping a credit or debit card. In 2022, Infillion acquired Analytiks, a company whose technology tracks the movement of customers visiting brick and mortar stores.

Infillion also offers out-of-home advertising services. For example, the company's Instadium product creates and places advertisements within sporting venues as well as mobile apps for teams and arenas.

== Recognition ==
In August 2010, Forbes recognized SocialVibe's engagement for Microsoft Bing on Zynga's FarmVille as one of the "Best-Ever Social Media Campaigns". The campaign garnered over 425,000 fans for Bing in less than one day, and 70% of the fans visited the search engine in the following month.
