= Living with Ed =

American reality television show

- Starring: Ed Begley, Jr. Rachelle Carson; Bill Nye
- Country of origin: United States

Production
- Running time: 30 minutes

Original release
- Network: HGTV (2007 version); Planet Green (2009 version)
- Release: January 1, 2007 – May 14, 2010

Living with Ed is an American reality television show starring Ed Begley Jr. It was originally shown on HGTV in 2007. In 2009, a new version began showing on the new Planet Green channel.

The show follows Begley in his quest to live his life with a small carbon footprint. The series records the conflicts between him and his less zealous wife, Rachelle Carson, who many times suffers due to her husband's uncompromising beliefs. One of the most frequent capers Begley engages in is making his home more environmentally friendly, competing with his best friend, Bill Nye. Other celebrities have appeared on the show, including Jay Leno, Jackson Browne, and Jack McGee.

Commenting in 2006 on the appeal of the show, Begley said:

"In the format of the show, everyone who watches—even people who have never thought about living a low-impact, environmentally conscious life—will be able to relate. They'll come away with a raised awareness, but they'll also enjoy seeing the differences between Rachelle and me."

In July 2009, Planet Green announced that it had produced 13 new episodes of the series that would begin airing on October 21, 2009.
