= Taylor-Dunn =

American manufacturer

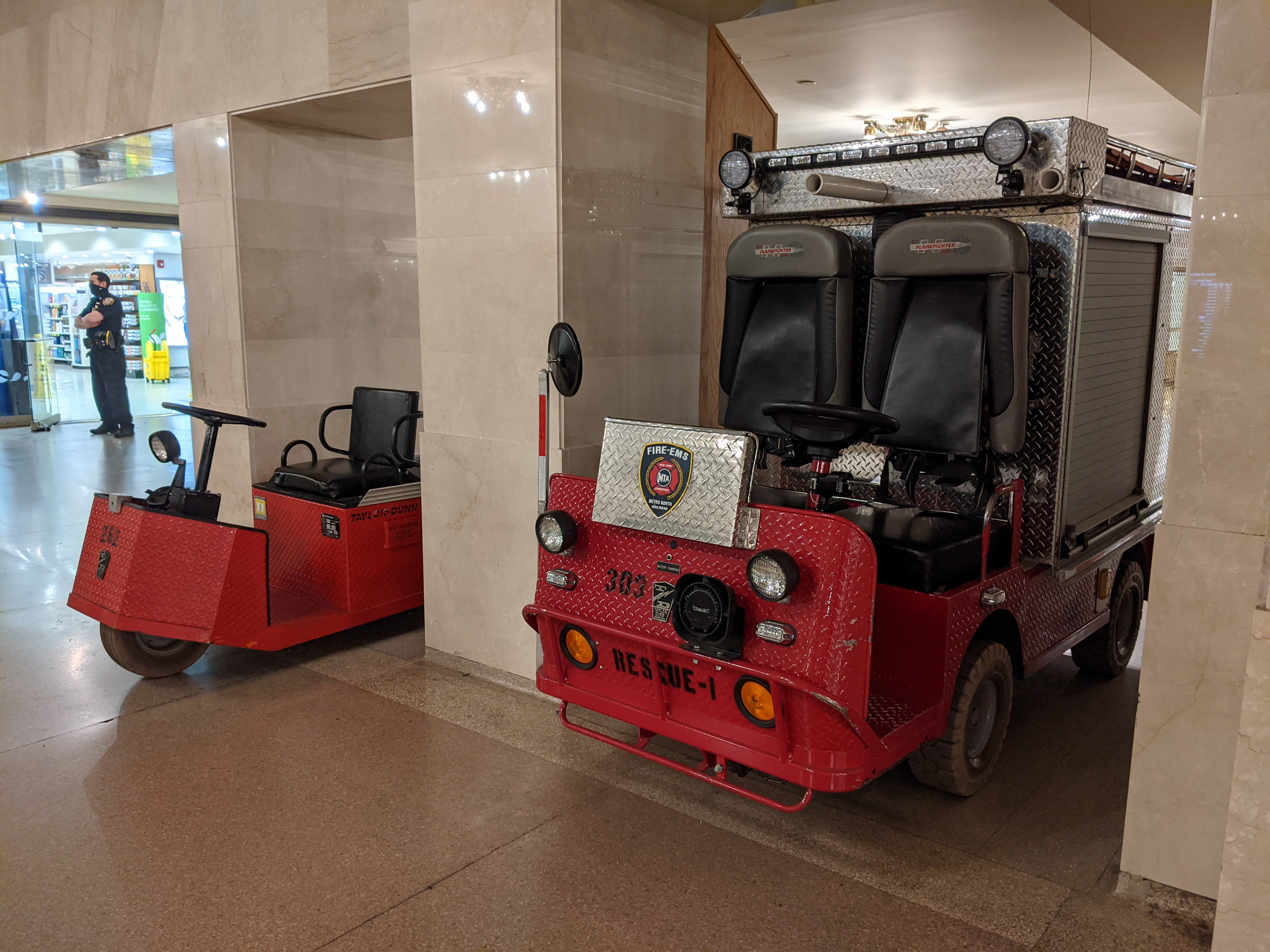
- A Taylor-Dunn personnel carrier and rescue truck in Grand Central Terminal
- Type: Subsidiary
- Industry: Automotive
- Founded: 1949; 77 years ago
- Founder: R.D. Taylor
- Headquarters: Anaheim, California, United States
- Products: Electric vehicles, industrial utility vehicles, personnel carriers
- Owner: Waev, Inc. (2022–present)
- Parent: Polaris Inc. (2016–2022)
- Website: www.taylor-dunn.com

Taylor-Dunn is a manufacturer of industrial electric vehicles. The company was founded in 1949 and is headquartered in Anaheim, California. The vehicles manufactured there are primarily for transporting people and equipment inside warehouses, factories, and work sites. Outdoor users have included airports, college campuses, resorts, and gated subdivisions.

== History ==
In 1949 an Anaheim farmer founded the company, having built an electric cart to use while feeding his chickens. Around 1990 the company was purchased by two electronics executives; by 1992 it had $25 million in annual sales, and about 60% of the market for electric utility vehicles.

In 1992 the company expanded to produce full-size trucks, with the Electruck, a larger utility vehicle still targeted for its current customers.

== Corporate transitions ==
In 2016 Polaris Inc. purchased the company, which at the time had 150 employees. Taylor-Dunn reported that it would retain its brand and headquarters. In 2022, Polaris sold Taylor-Dunn and GEM to a group of former Polaris executives. The group would operate both brands at Taylor-Dunn's headquarters under the name Waev, Inc.
