= Dodgeball (service) =

Company

- Genre: Social networking
- Founded: 2000
- Founder: Dennis Crowley and Alex Rainert
- Defunct: Shut down in February 2009
- Fate: Acquired by Google in 2005
- Successors: Google Latitude; Foursquare
- Key people: Dennis Crowley and Alex Rainert
- Owner: Google

Dodgeball was a location-based social networking software provider for mobile devices. Users texted their locations to the service, which then notified them of crushes, friends, friends' friends, and interesting venues nearby. Google acquired Dodgeball in 2004 and discontinued it in 2009, replacing it with Google Latitude.

== Overview ==
Dodgeball was founded in 2000 by New York University students Dennis Crowley and Alex Rainert. The keep company was acquired by Google in 2005. In April 2007, Crowley and Rainert left Google, with Crowley describing their experience there as "incredibly frustrating". After leaving Google, Crowley created a similar service known as Foursquare with the help of Naveen Selvadurai.

Dodgeball was available for the cities of Seattle, Portland, San Francisco, Los Angeles, Las Vegas, San Diego, Phoenix, Dallas–Fort Worth, Austin, Houston, New Orleans, Miami, Atlanta, Washington, D.C., Philadelphia, New York City, Boston, Detroit, Chicago, Madison, Minneapolis–St. Paul and Denver.

In January 2009, Vic Gundotra, Vice President of Engineering at Google, announced that the company would "discontinue Dodgeball.com in the next couple of months, after which this service will no longer be available." Dodgeball was shut down and succeeded in February 2009 by Google Latitude. Google Latitude was eventually shut down in 2013.

== See also ==
- Location-based service
- Mobile dating
- Geosocial networking
- Foursquare
