= Jerry James Stone =

American food blogger

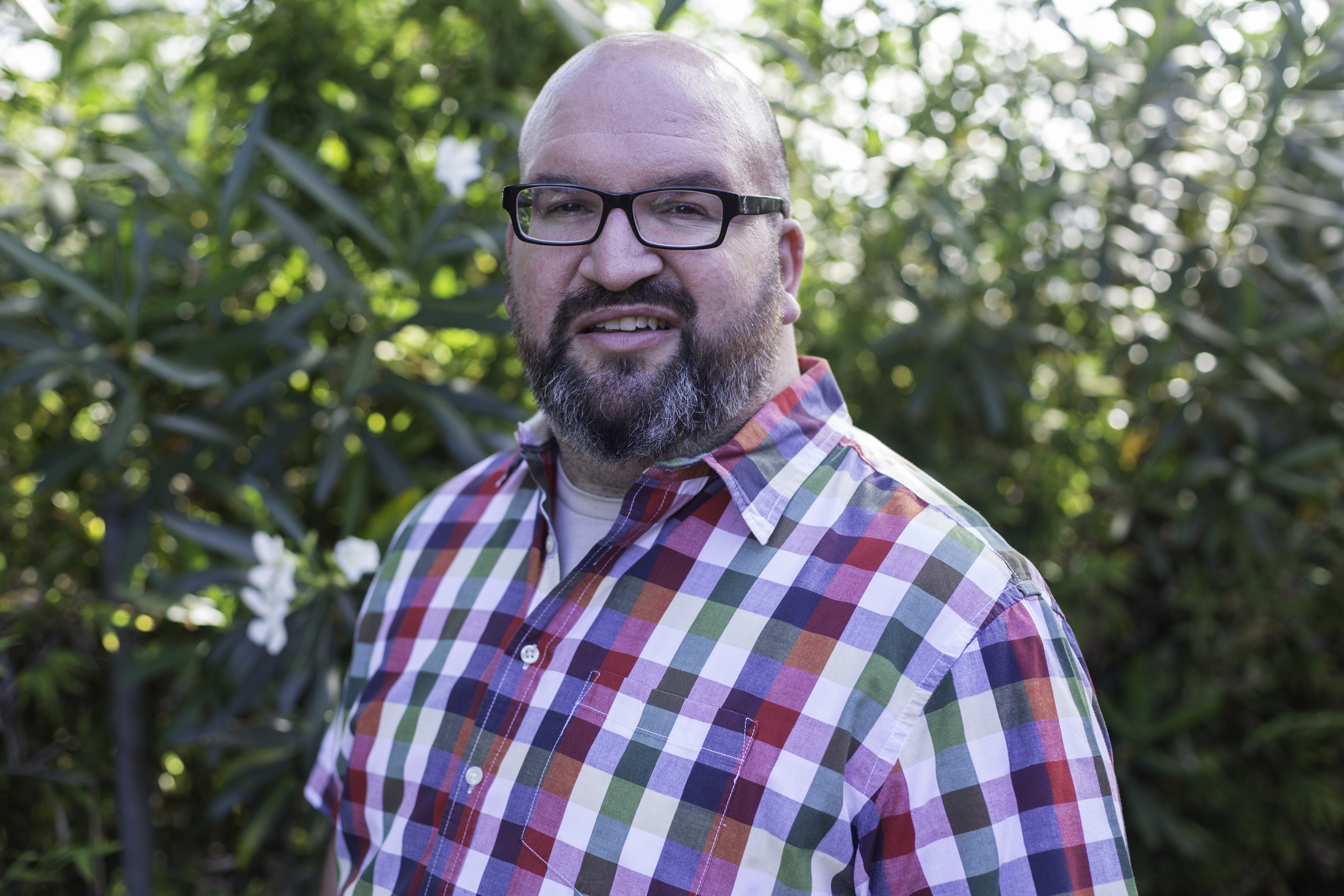
- Born: Jerry James Stone; August 28, 1973 (age 52); Los Angeles, United States
- Education: California Polytech
- Occupation: Food Blogger

YouTube information
- Channel: Jerry James Stone
- Years active: 2012–present
- Genre: Food
- Subscribers: 145 thousand
- Views: 27 million
- Website: www.jerryjamesstone.com

Jerry James Stone is an American food blogger, vegetarian chef, activist, and internet personality, known for simple gourmet recipes, advocacy for a sustainable food and wine movement, and as a social media personality. In 2015, a Sierra Club magazine article named him one of nine chefs changing the world.

In 2012, Stone won a Shorty Award in the “Green” category (for which he was nominated by Green Festivals), and joined the advisory board of SXSW for their festival's environmental conference, SXSW Eco. Stone's career began as a computer engineer at the U.S. Department of Defense. His early engagement in the technology industry and environmental movement led him to blog for the Discovery Channel. He attracted enough interest that YouTube approached him to start a channel, Cooking Stoned. The channel was later renamed to Jerry James Stone. Prior to focusing on the sustainable food movement, he contributed to The Atlantic, Discovery Channel's Tree Hugger and Animal Planet, and MAKE Magazine. In 2014, Jerry started the Three Loaves project for organizing home cooks to help feed the homeless in their community. He has developed recipes for Whole Foods Market, Costco, and Cline Cellars. His recipes have also been featured by the Today Show and People Magazine. He was written about in Forbes in 2020. As of 2015, he has more than 600,000 social media followers.

== Books authored ==
- Stone, Jerry James; Branch, Michelle (2013). Holidazed. Cooking Stoned. ISBN 978-0991089710.
- Stone, Jerry James; Begley Jr., Ed (2014). A Vegan Survival Guide for the Holidays. Cooking Stoned.
- Stone, Jerry James; Cornwall, K.C. (2017). Made with Coffee - a Cookbook for Coffee Lovers, Caffeine Addicts, and Foodies. Oh Hye, LLC. ISBN 978-0991089727.
