= Naveen Selvadurai =

American internet entrepreneur (born 1982)

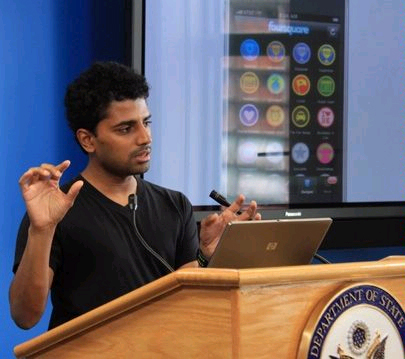
- Naveen Selvadurai in 2011.
- Born: January 27, 1982 (age 44); Chennai, Tamil Nadu, India
- Education: Worcester Polytechnic Institute, King's College London
- Occupation: Internet entrepreneur
- Known for: Co-founder of Foursquare

Naveen Selvadurai (born January 27, 1982) is an American internet entrepreneur and co-founder of location-based social networking site Foursquare.com. Until recently, he was working at startup studio Expa which was founded by co-founder of Uber and StumbleUpon - Garrett Camp, as a partner. He was featured in Inc Magazine's 30 under 30 list in the year 2010. He was also featured in Rediff.com's article - 4 NRIs among US's coolest young entrepreneurs.

== Early life ==
He was born on the January 27, 1982 in Chennai, India, to Kuppuswamy Selvadurai and Latha Selvadurai. He was their first child and has a younger sister Chindhuri Selvadurai.

== Career ==
Selvadurai graduated in 4 years from Worcester Polytechnic Institute with a Bachelor of Science in Computer Science and a Master of Science in Computer Science in Worcester, MA. During his time at Worcester, he spent 5 months in his junior year on a study abroad programme at King's College London. He went on to work with Lucent, Sony, Nokia and Sun Microsystems before he started his mobile social-networking venture Foursquare, along with Dennis Crowley.

He has been on Fox Business Network, and CNN's special by Fareed Zakaria, "Getting American Back to #1," talking about how he became the person that he is today.

== Foursquare ==
In 2009, Selvadurai co-founded Foursquare with Dennis Crowley. It is a location-based social networking website for mobile devices, such as smartphones. Users "check in" at venues using a mobile website, text messaging or a device-specific application by selecting from a list of venues the application locates nearby. Location is based on GPS hardware in the mobile device or network location provided by the application, and the map is based on data from the OpenStreetMap project. Each check-in awards the user points and sometimes "badges". The user who checks in the most often to a venue becomes the "mayor," and users regularly vie for "mayorships."

On March 4, 2012, Selvadurai announced on his blog that he will step down from his day-to-day operational role at the company later that month. He said he will continue to serve as a board member and adviser to the company. According to Naveen, he was pushed out of his position in Foursquare. According to an article published in FastCompany, he mentions that "There was pretty much no other role for me at the company. Beside the CEO, there's nothing a founder can really stick around to do. You don't know a lot of these things when you're starting off." and this was extensively covered by multiple sources and it surfaced out that he sold his stock of Foursquare to Spark Capital before leaving the company.

Selvadurai joined the Expa startup studio, founded in May 2013 by former Uber and StumbleUpon founder Garrett Camp. Selvadurai joins Expa as a partner focused on New York operations for the organization.

== Personal life ==
Naveen married Diana Marie Hardeman in 2017.
