= Dennis Crowley =

American Internet entrepreneur

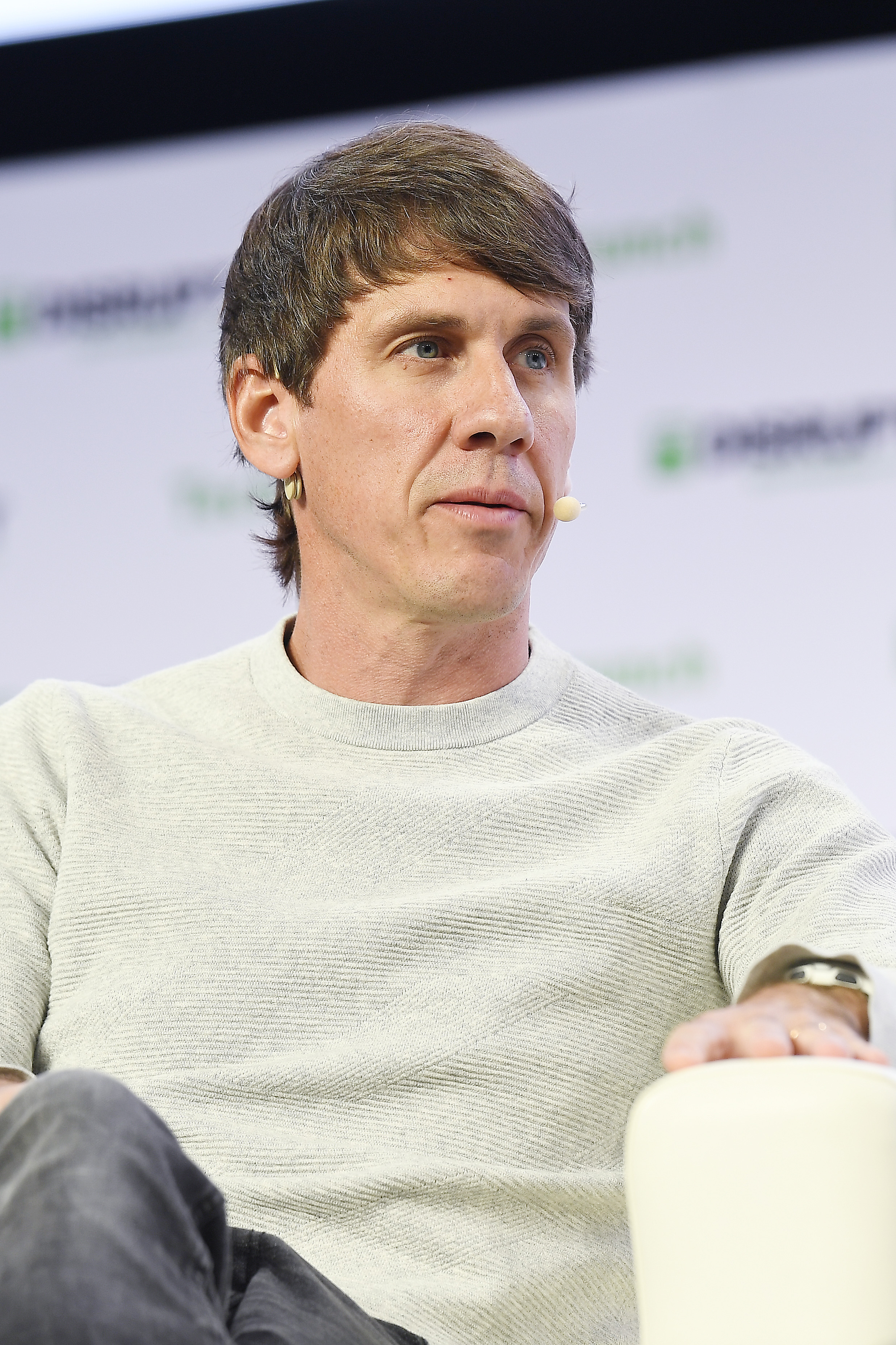
- Crowley in 2019
- Born: June 19, 1976 (age 50); Medway, Massachusetts, U.S.
- Education: Xaverian Brothers High School; Syracuse University (B.A. 1998); New York University (M.P.S. 2004)
- Occupation: Internet entrepreneur
- Known for: Co-founder of Dodgeball and Foursquare
- Website: denniscrowley.com

Dennis Crowley (born June 19, 1976) is an American Internet entrepreneur who co-founded the social networking sites Dodgeball and Foursquare.

== Early life and education ==
Crowley was born in Medway, Massachusetts to Mary Moraski Crowley and Dennis P. Crowley.

He graduated from Xaverian Brothers High School in Westwood, Massachusetts in 1994. In 1998, he received a B.A. from Syracuse University's S.I. Newhouse School of Public Communications. In 2004, he received a M.P.S. master's degree from New York University's Tisch School of the Arts Interactive Telecommunications Program (ITP).

== Career ==
After graduating from Syracuse, in 1998, Crowley worked as a researcher for Jupiter Communications. He lost his job during the dot-com bubble and moved home to New Hampshire for seven months. In 2000, he joined mobile app provider Vindigo as a product developer.

In 2003, Crowley co-founded Dodgeball with fellow student, Alex Rainert, while attending New York University. Dodgeball was acquired by Google in 2005.

After Google abandoned the Dodgeball project in 2007, Crowley found work at a company called Area/Code where he met Naveen Selvadurai and co-founded Foursquare in 2009. Foursquare, known for its location intelligence offerings for both enterprises and consumers, is used by more than 50 million people every month. In January 2016, after seven years as CEO, Crowley handed the role of CEO to Jeff Glueck and became Executive Chairman of the company.

He was an adjunct professor in New York University's Interactive Telecommunications Program.

In 2024, Crowley began a new startup, Hopscotch Labs, co-founded with Max Sklar and Alejandro Fragoso. Hopscotch labs created an app called BeeBot, which uses Bluetooth headphones such as Airpods to give users information about places and events nearby in real time.

== Awards ==
Crowley was named one of Fortune Magazine's "40 Under 40" (2010 & 2011), was featured on Vanity Fair's "New Establishment" list (2011–2012), and was named in the MIT Technology Review "TR35" as one of the top 35 innovators in the world under the age of 35 (2005).

In 2012, Crowley received the George Arents Award for Excellence in Social Media Innovation from Syracuse University.

== Personal life ==
Crowley married Chelsa Lynn Skees at Buttermilk Falls Inn in Milton, N.Y. Sarah Simmons, a Universal Life Church minister, officiated.

Crowley is the Founder and Chairman of Kingston Stockade FC, a semi-professional soccer team in the Hudson Valley region of the state of New York that competes in the fourth division of the United States soccer pyramid.

In 2014, Crowley admitted to producing a fraudulent Boston Marathon bib for his wife, Chelsa Crowley, to use. He apologized for his actions. In a statement, Crowley admitted what he had done had "overshadowed the event for those who ran and those who ran to honor others".

== Appearances ==
Crowley delivered the commencement speech at the Syracuse University School of Information Studies in 2011.

In 2015, he was a keynote speaker at the Congress of Future Science and Technology Leaders.
