= Charles Chen =

Charles Chen may refer to:

- Blackie Chen (born 1977), Taiwanese actor and former basketball player
- Chen Chan-siang (1916–2001), Chinese architect and urban planner
- Chen I-hsin (born 1972), Taiwanese politician
- Chen Yidan (born 1971), Chinese entrepreneur and philanthropist
- Charles Chen Seong Fook, Malaysian sport shooter who competed at the 2001 Southeast Asian Games and the 2010, 2014, 2018 Commonwealth Games
