= Chen Yidan =

Chinese internet entrepreneur (born 1971)

Chen Yidan 陈一丹
- Born: 1971 (age 54–55); Huizhou, Guangdong, China
- Education: Shenzhen University; Nanjing University; Singapore Management University
- Occupations: Co-founder and former CAO of Tencent; Founder of Wuhan College; Founder of the Chen Yidan Charity Foundation; Founder of the Yidan Prize Foundation

Chen Yidan (陈一丹, born 1971), also known as Charles Chen, is a Chinese internet entrepreneur and philanthropist. He is a co-founder of Tencent, founder of the Chen Yidan Charity Foundation, and founder of the Yidan Prize Foundation.

== Education ==
Chen Yidan was born in Huizhou, Guangdong, and grew up in Shenzhen, Guangdong. He obtained a bachelor's degree in applied chemistry from Shenzhen University and a master's degree in economic law from Nanjing University. He subsequently earned a Doctor of Business Administration from Singapore Management University.

== Tencent ==
In 1998, Chen Yidan co-founded the internet holding company Tencent alongside Ma Huateng, Zhang Zhidong, Xu Chenye, and Zeng Liqing. He served as the company's chief administrative officer (CAO). Yidan also led the company's Tencent Charity Foundation.

In March 2013, Yidan stepped down as Tencent's CAO. He continued to be involved with the company as an advisor, sponsor, and honorary chairman of the Tencent Charity Foundation.

== Philanthropy ==
In March 2013, Chen Yidan founded the Chen Yidan Charity Foundation after stepping down from his role as CAO of Tencent.

=== Wuhan College ===
In 2009, Yidan cofounded Wuhan College and became a school initiator. In 2015, Yidan donated RMB20 million to support the college's library construction and reading material purchases.

=== The Yidan Prize ===
In May 2016, Chen founded the Yidan Prize, funded by an independent trust of HK $2.5 billion (US$320 million). The award was established to recognize innovators and those who had made contributions to education. The Prize included two annual awards, the Yidan Prize for Education Development and the Yidan Prize for Education Research. Each prize included a cash award of HK $15 million as well as a project fund of HK $15 million.

=== Recognition ===
In 2015 Yidan was named to the China Philanthropy Institute's list of top Chinese philanthropists. In 2016, he appeared on the China Charity Ranking List as well. In June 2017, he was named one of China's top philanthropists by Forbes.
