= South China =

Geographical and cultural region

- Region
- 华南
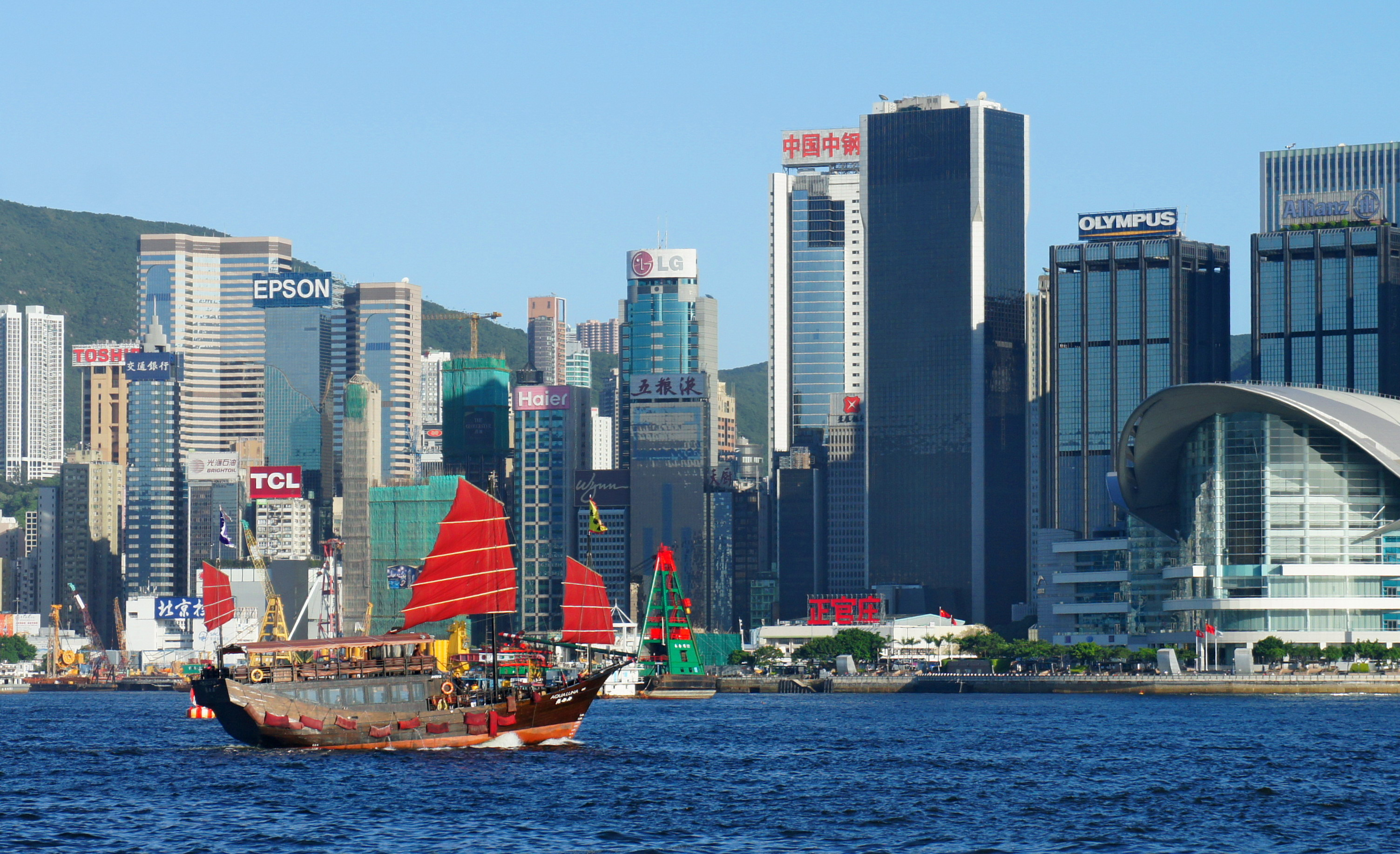
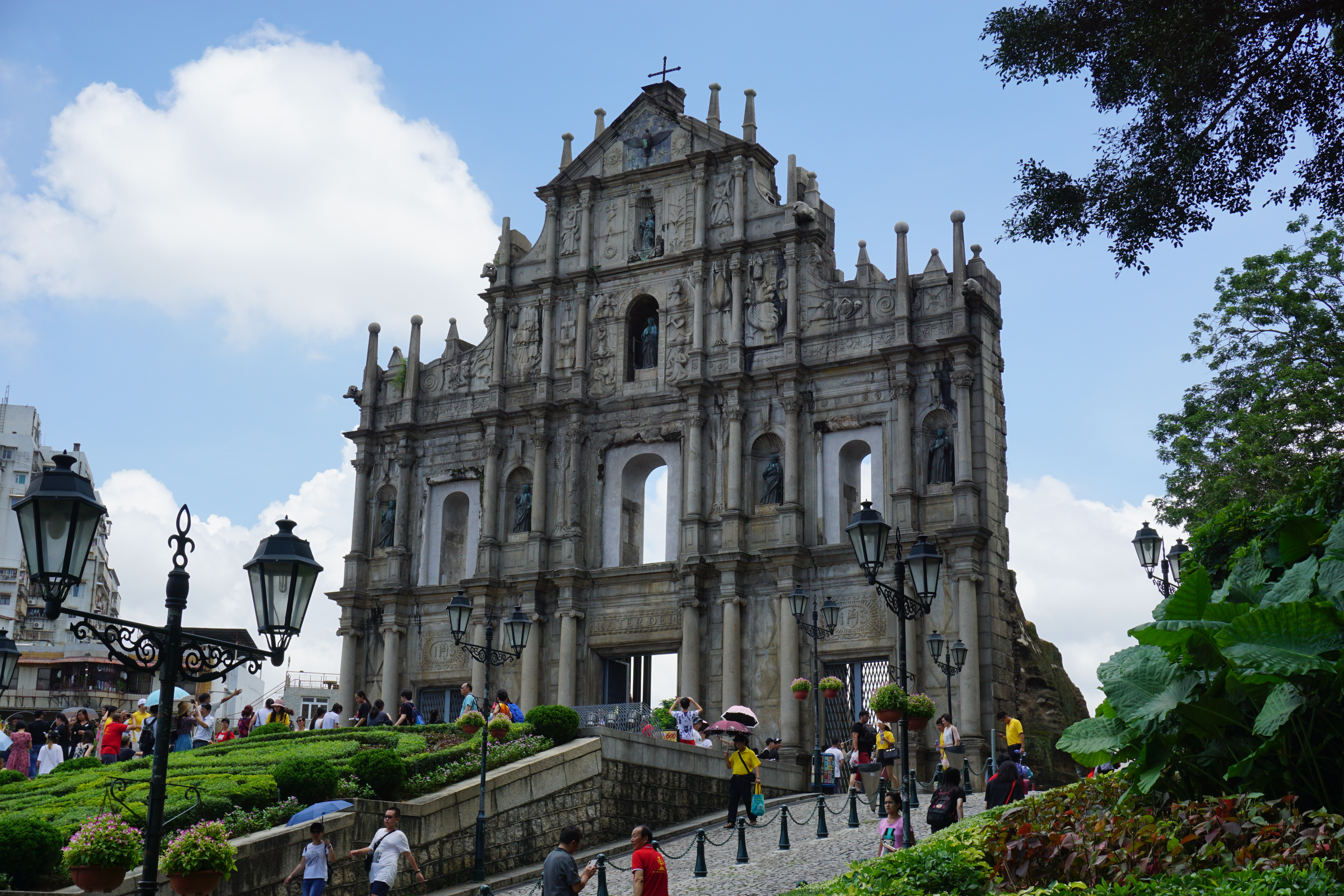
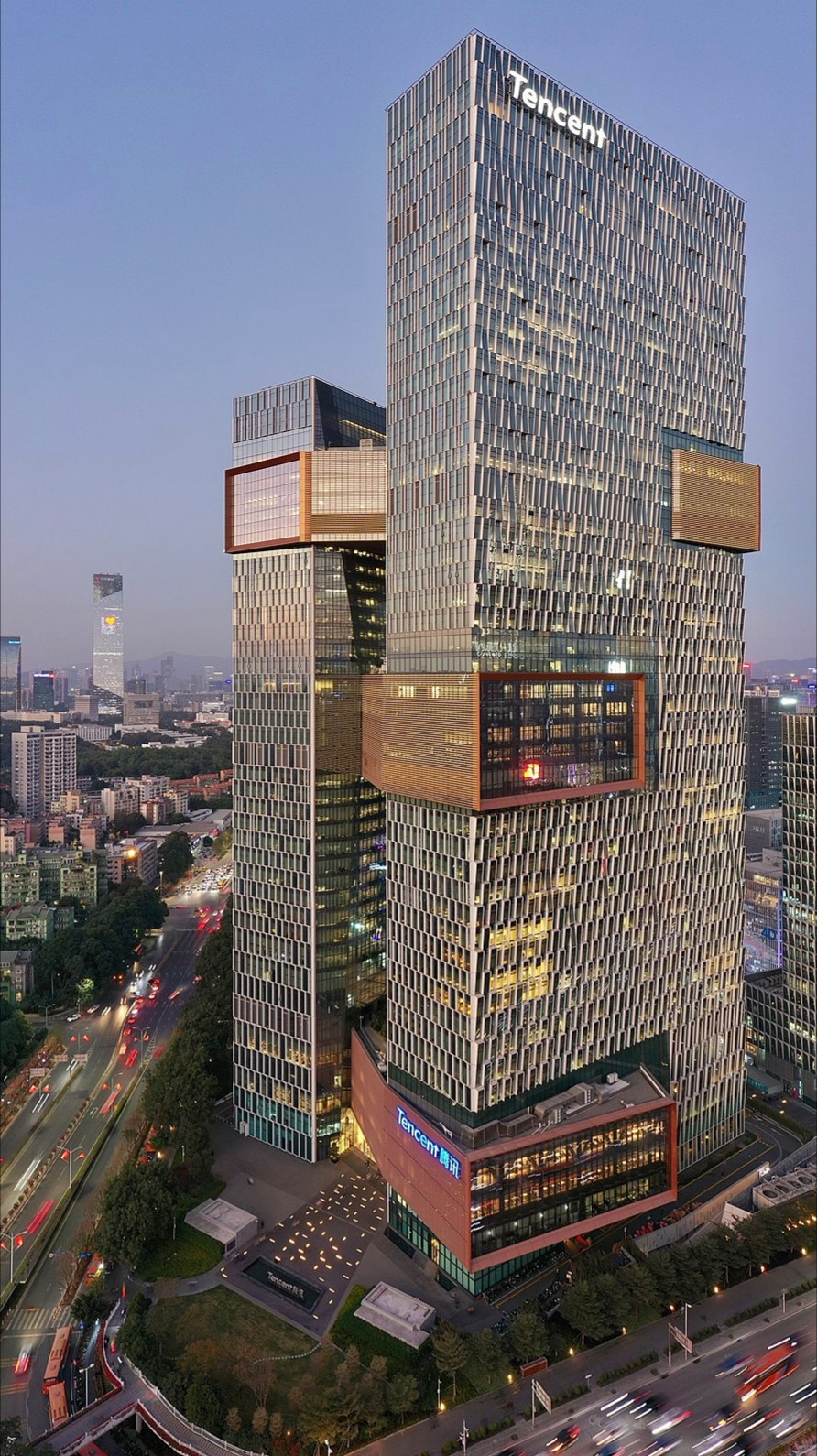
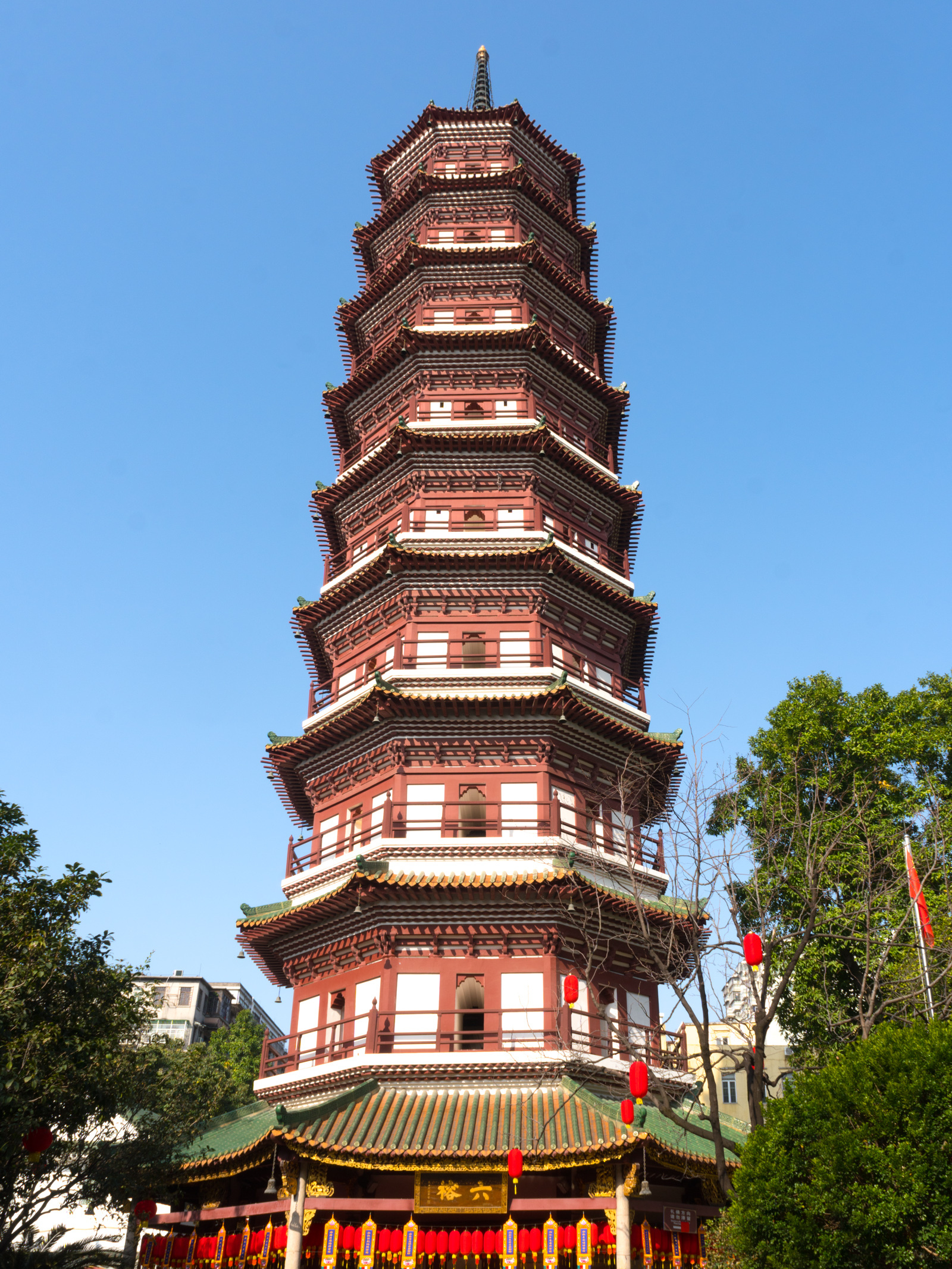
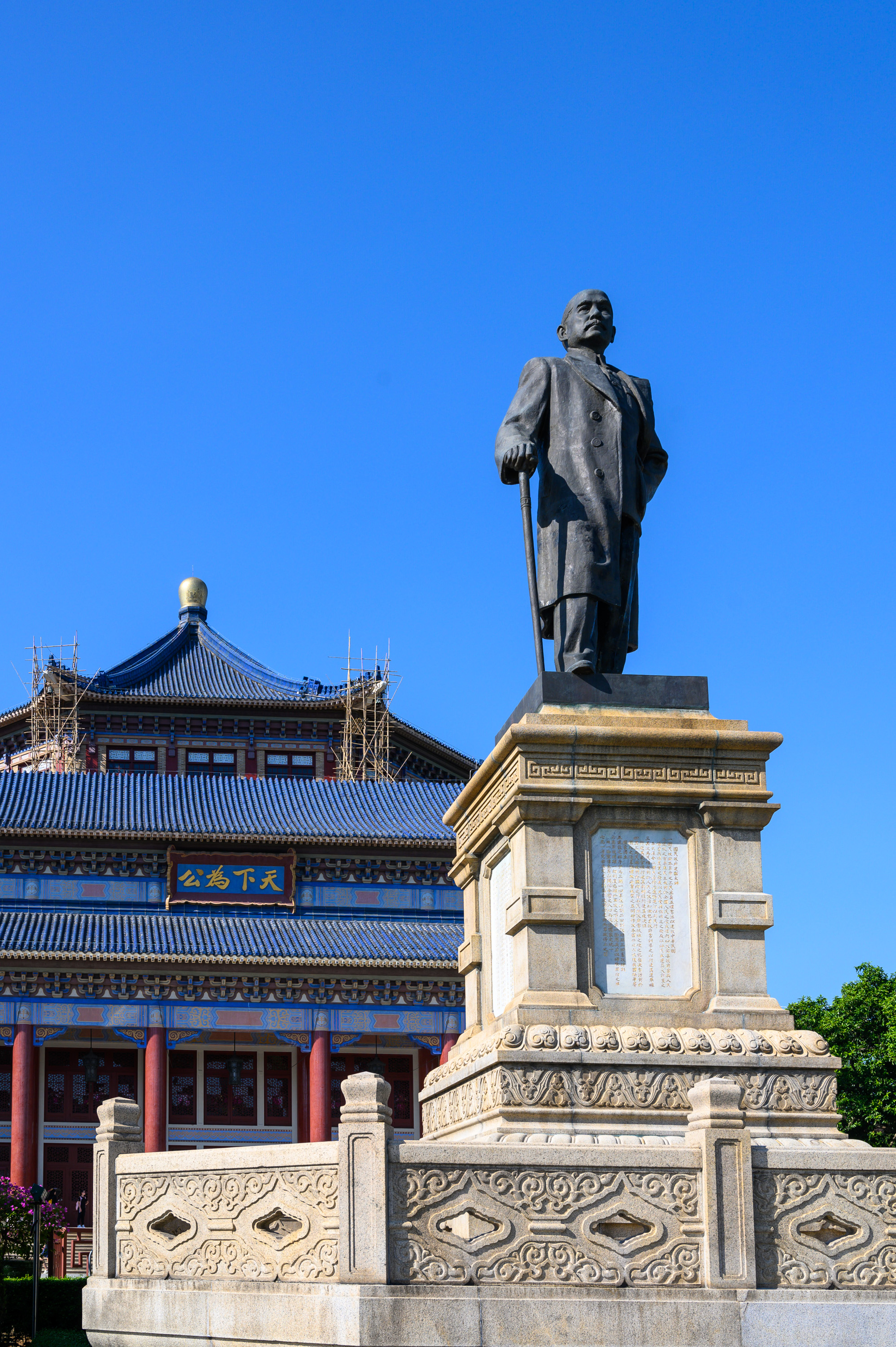
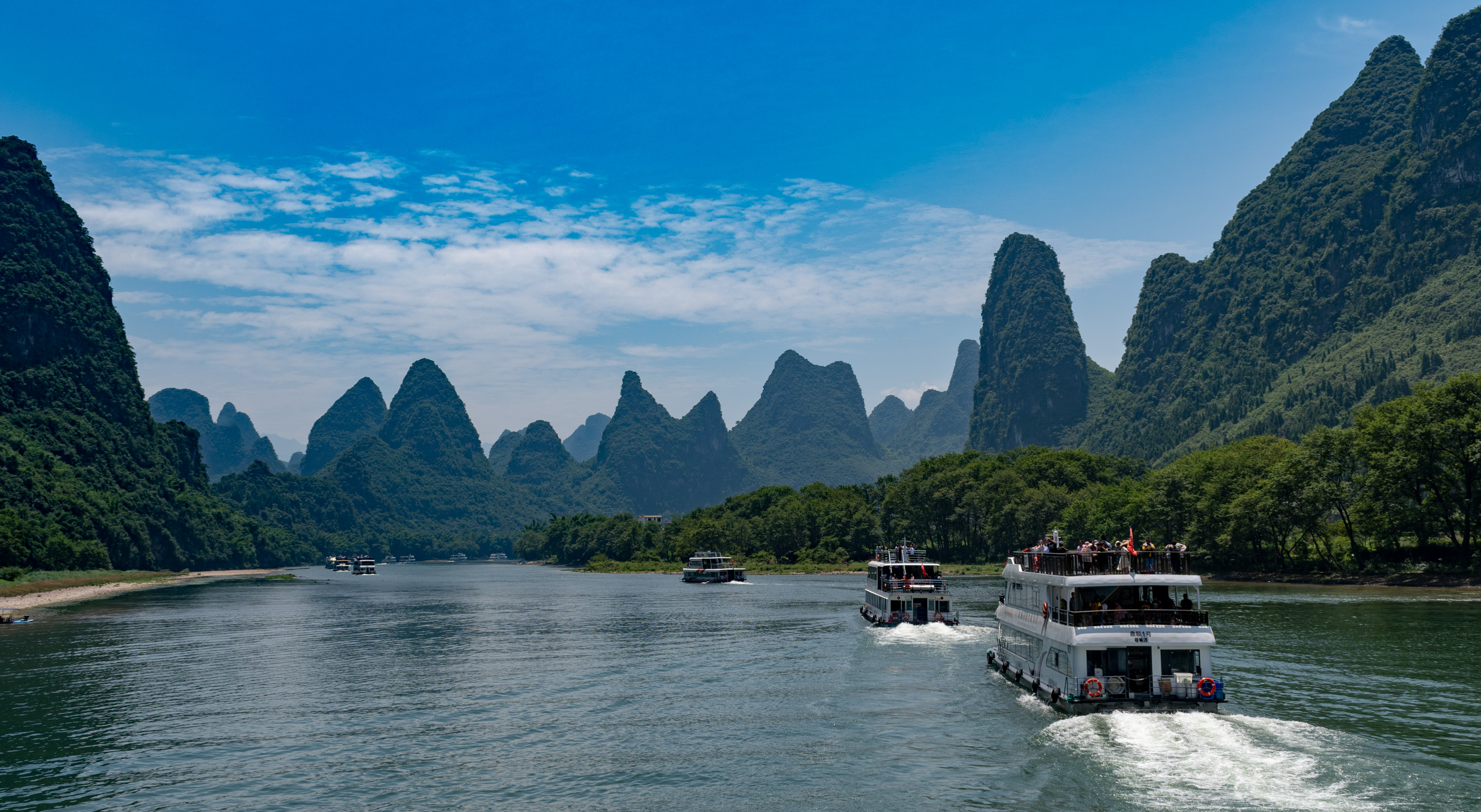
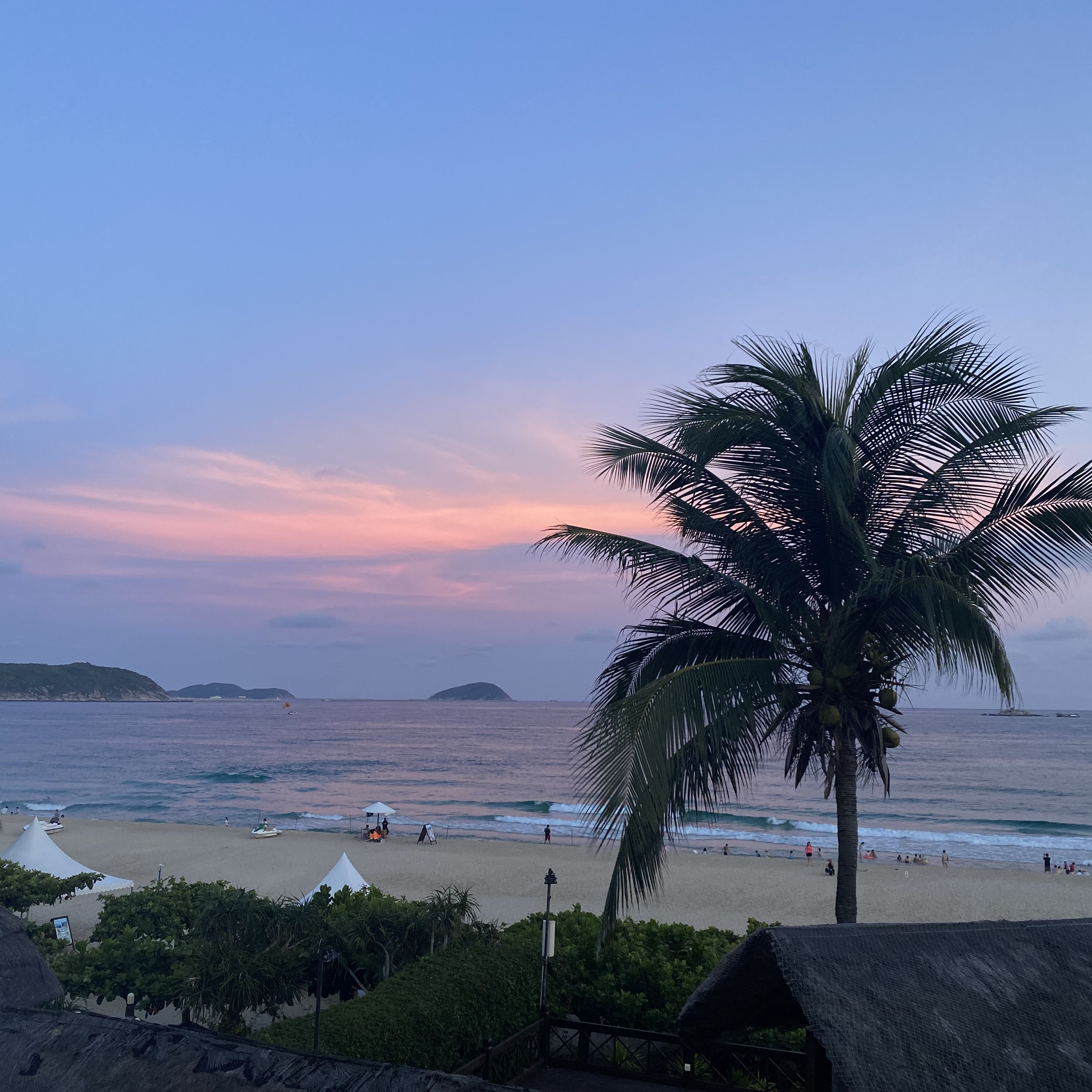
- Victoria Harbour, Hong Kong Ruins of Saint Paul's in Macau Tencent Binhai Mansion, Shenzhen Liurong Temple, Guangzhou Sun Yat-sen Memorial Hall Li River in Guangxi Beach in Sanya

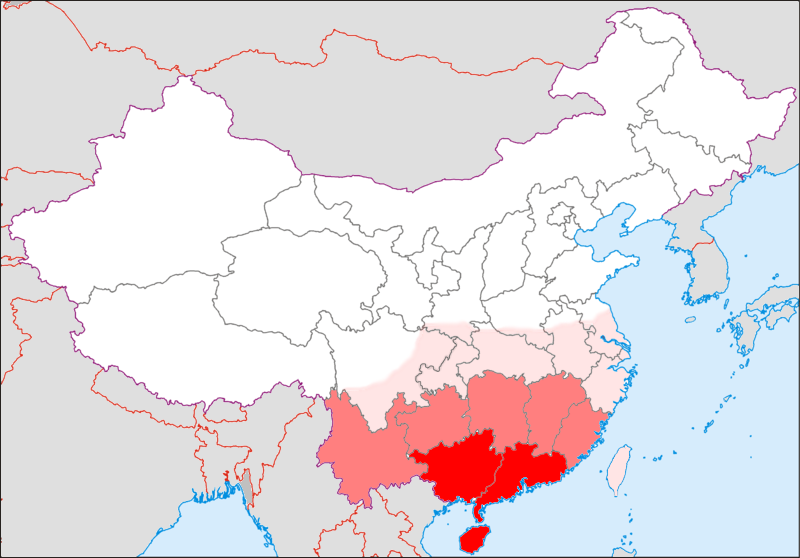
- The three southernmost provinces of China—Guangdong, Guangxi, and Hainan—commonly defined as South China Expanded definition of South China based on the 1945–1949 classification, including additional southern provinces Broad concept of Southern China encompassing a wider geographical and cultural region
- Country: China
- Provinces & SARs: Guangdong; Guangxi; Hainan; Hong Kong; Macau
- Major cities: Guangzhou; Shenzhen; Nanning; Haikou; Hong Kong; Macau

Population (2020 census)
  - Total: 195.5 million
- Demonym: South Chinese
- Time zone: UTC+08:00 (China Standard, Hong Kong Time, Macau Standard)

South China (simplified Chinese: 华南; traditional Chinese: 華南; pinyin: Huánán; Jyutping: waa4 naam4) is a geographical and cultural region that covers the southernmost part of China. Its precise meaning varies with context. A notable feature of South China in comparison to the rest of China proper is that most of its citizens are not native speakers of Standard Chinese.

== Definition ==
=== Southern China ===
"Southern China" (simplified Chinese: 中国南方; traditional Chinese: 中國南方) is geographically defined as the vast region south of the Qinling–Huaihe Line. This division is based on differences in climate, economic production, transportation, and culture. The southern region is characterized by a subtropical monsoon climate and tropical monsoon climate, with winters that are mild and rarely snowy. The climate is generally warm, rice is the primary grain crop, and historically, waterways were the main mode of transportation.

=== South China ===
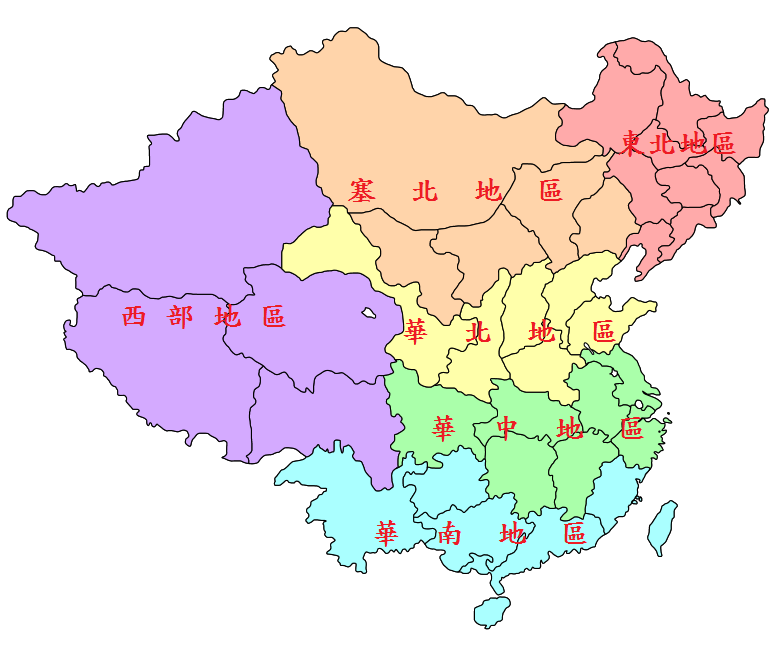
Regional divisions in historical textbooks of the Republic of China, with South China (light blue area) including the six provinces of Yunnan, Guizhou, Guangxi, Guangdong, Fujian, Taiwan, and the Hainan

"South China" (simplified Chinese: 华南; traditional Chinese: 華南) specifically refers to Lingnan, meaning the region "south of the Wuling Mountains", the mountain which roughly goes near the 28th parallel north.

When Republic of China held its power in the mainland before 1949, South China was defined as comprising six provinces: Guangdong, Guangxi, Guizhou, Yunnan, Fujian, and Taiwan, collectively referred to as the 'Six Provinces of South China'.

In June 1946, the Chinese Communist Party established CCP Bureau of South China in Hong Kong. During the Second Chinese Civil War, CCP Bureau of Southeast China was established, following the incorporation of Guizhou and Yunnan into that region.

From 1949 to 1997, there were only three provinces in South China region, which were Guangdong Province, Guangxi Zhuang Autonomous Region, and Hainan Province. After the handover of Hong Kong and Macau by the United Kingdom and Portugal, these two regions are now also considered part of South China.

== Administrative divisions ==
GB	ISO №	Province	Chinese Name	Capital	Population	Density	Area	Abbreviation	Abbr. in Chinese
Yuè	44	Guangdong Province	广东省; Guǎngdōng Shěng; Gwong2dung1 Saang2	Guangzhou	104,303,132	579.46	180,000	GD	粤
Guì	45	Guangxi Zhuang Autonomous Region	广西壮族自治区; Guǎngxī Zhuàngzú Zìzhìqū; Gwong2sai1 Zong3zuk6 Zi6zi6keoi1	Nanning	46,026,629	195.02	236,000	GX	桂
Qióng	46	Hainan Province	海南省; Hǎinán Shěng; Háinâm Téng	Haikou	8,671,518	255.04	34,000	HI	琼
Gǎng	91	Hong Kong Special Administrative Region	香港特别行政区; Xiānggǎng Tèbié Xíngzhèngqū; Hoeng2gong1 Dak6bit6 Hang4zing3keoi1	Tamar	7,061,200	6,396.01	1,104	HK	港
Ào	92	Macau Special Administrative Region	澳门特别行政区; Àomén Tèbié Xíngzhèngqū; Ou3mun2 Dak6bit6 Han4zing3keoi1	Macau	552,300	19,044.82	29	MC	澳

== Cities with urban area over one million in population ==
Provincial capitals in bold.

#	City	Urban area	District area	City proper	Prov.	Census date
1	Shenzhen	10,358,381	10,358,381	10,358,381	GD	2010-11-01
2	**Guangzhou**	9,702,144	11,071,424	12,701,948	GD	2010-11-01
3	Dongguan	7,271,322	8,220,207	8,220,207	GD	2010-11-01
4	Hong Kong	7,071,576	7,071,576	7,071,576	HK	2011-06-30
5	Foshan	6,771,895	7,197,394	7,197,394	GD	2010-11-01
6	Shantou	3,644,017	5,329,024	5,389,328	GD	2010-11-01
7	Zhongshan	2,740,994	3,121,275	3,121,275	GD	2010-11-01
8	**Nanning**	2,660,833	3,434,303	6,658,742	GX	2010-11-01
9	Huizhou	1,807,858	2,344,634	4,598,402	GD	2010-11-01
10	**Haikou**	1,517,410	2,046,170	2,046,170	HI	2010-11-01
11	Jiangmen	1,480,023	1,822,614	4,450,703	GD	2010-11-01
12	Liuzhou	1,410,712	1,436,599	3,758,704	GX	2010-11-01
13	Zhuhai	1,369,538	1,562,530	1,562,530	GD	2010-11-01
14	Zhanjiang	1,038,762	1,611,868	6,994,832	GD	2010-11-01
15	Macau	552,503	552,503	552,503	MO	2011-08-12

== Education ==
South China has accumulated substantial wealth and established several prestigious universities. Notably, the University of Hong Kong was founded in 1887 in British Hong Kong, becoming the region’s first modern university and a leading institution for English-language higher education in Asia. In 1924, Sun Yat-sen University was established in Guangzhou by Sun Yat-sen, serving as a cornerstone of modern Chinese higher education in the mainland.

After the founding of the People's Republic of China in 1949, Guangzhou was designated as the central city of South China, leading to the establishment of several key regional universities. These include South China University of Technology, known for its engineering and materials science; South China Normal University, a major center for teacher education; South China Agricultural University, specializing in tropical and subtropical agriculture; and Jinan University, one of the oldest institutions in China, with a unique focus on overseas Chinese education.

Following China's Reform and opening-up policy in the late 1970s, the city of Shenzhen experienced rapid economic growth and emerged as a major innovation and technology hub. In response, Shenzhen University got rapid development, and several prominent universities established branch campuses or new institutions in this city. For example, Tsinghua University launched the Tsinghua Shenzhen International Graduate School, and Peking University established the Peking University Shenzhen Graduate School. In addition, the newly founded Southern University of Science and Technology (SUSTech) quickly gained recognition as a high-caliber research university with international faculty and strong emphasis on science and engineering.

=== Guangdong ===
- Sun Yat-sen University
- South China University of Technology
- Southern University of Science and Technology
- South China Normal University
- Jinan University
- Shenzhen University
- Guangdong University of Foreign Studies

=== Guangxi and Hainan ===
- Guangxi University
- Guangxi Normal University
- Hainan University

=== Hong Kong and Macau ===
- University of Hong Kong
- Chinese University of Hong Kong
- Hong Kong University of Science and Technology
- City University of Hong Kong
- University of Macau
- Macau University of Science and Technology

== Namesake ==
- South China tiger (southern China)
- South China Morning Post (Hong Kong, South China)
- Huanan Seafood Wholesale Market (Wuhan, Central China)
- South China Athletic Association (Hong Kong SAR, China)

== See also ==
- Lingnan
- List of regions of China
  - Southern China
    - South Central China — includes South China and "Central China" provincial-level subdivisions.
