= Tony Zhang =

Chinese businessman

Zhang Zhidong 张志东
- Born: 1972 (age 53–54)
- Education: Shenzhen University; South China University of Technology
- Occupations: Co-founder and former CTO, Tencent
- Spouse: Married
- Children: 2

Tony Zhang Zhidong (Chinese: 张志东, born 1972) is a Chinese businessman who is the co-founder, former CTO and second-largest individual shareholder of Tencent, a Chinese internet conglomerate.

== Early life and education ==
Zhang Zhidong was born in 1971. He was in the same class at Shenzhen University as Tencent's founder, fellow billionaire Ma Huateng. He also has a master's degree from South China University of Technology.

== Career ==
According to Forbes, Zhang Zhidong has a net worth of $24.1 billion, as of March 2021.

Zhang was Tencent's Chief Technology Officer for 16 years until his retirement in September 2014.

== Personal life ==
He lives in Shenzhen.
