= Tencent =

Chinese conglomerate and holding company

Tencent Holdings Ltd.

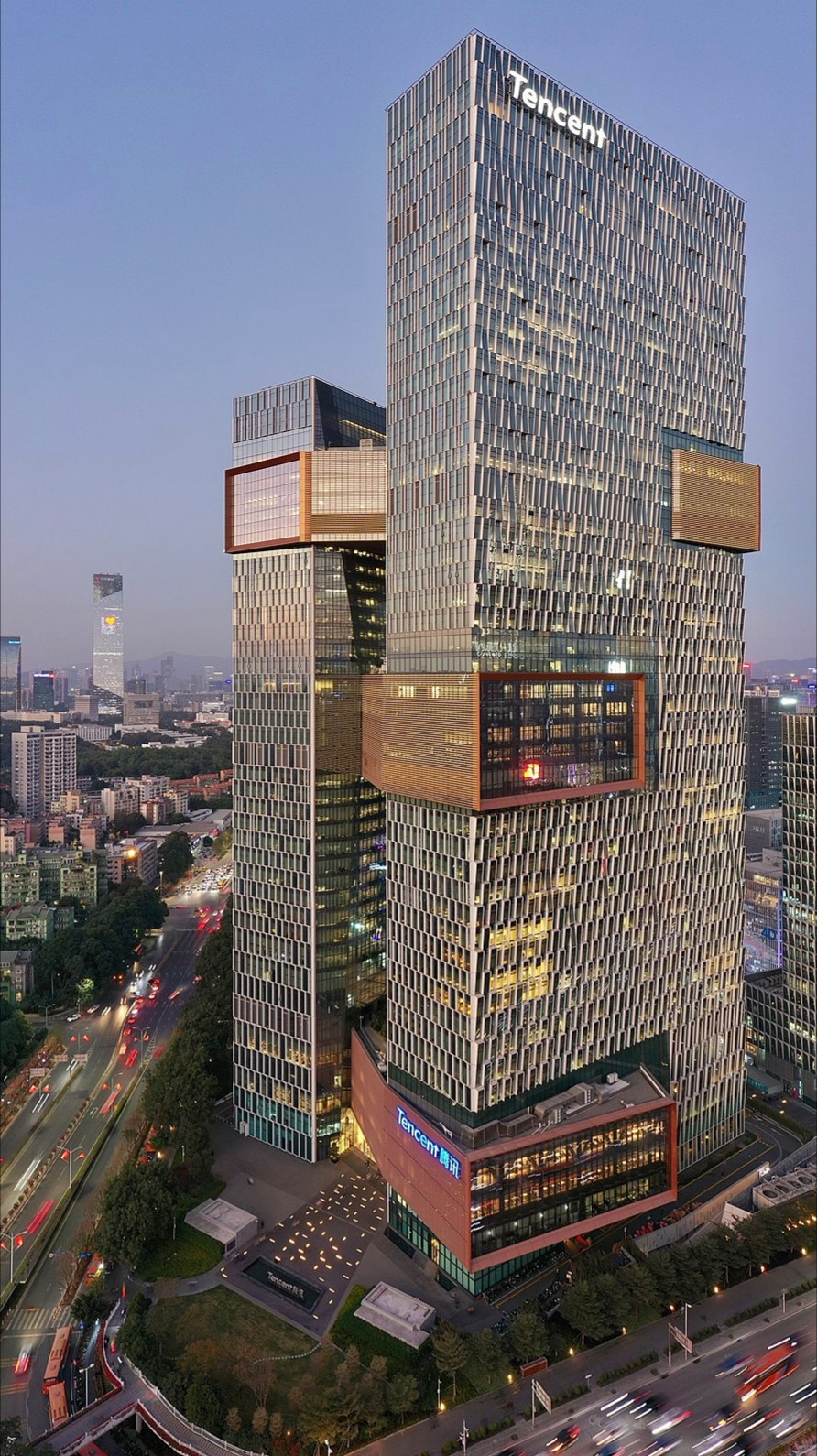
- Tencent Seafront Towers in Shenzhen
- Native name: 腾讯控股有限公司
- Type: Public
- Traded as: SEHK: 700; Hang Seng Index component
- ISIN: KYG875721634
- Industry: Conglomerate
- Founded: 7 November 1998; 28 years ago
- Founders: Pony Ma; Tony Zhang; Xu Chenye; Charles Chen; Zeng Liqing
- Headquarters: Tencent Binhai Mansion, Nanshan District, Shenzhen, Guangdong, China
- Key people: Pony Ma (chairman, CEO); Martin Lau (executive director, president)
- Products: Antivirus software; Artificial intelligence; Video games; Web browsers
- Services: Cloud computing; E-commerce; Film production; Instant messaging; Mass media; Payment systems; Music streaming; Search engines; Social networking; Web portals
- Revenue: ▲CN¥751.8 billion (2025) (US$112.23 billion)
- Operating income: ▲CN¥241.6 billion (2025) (US$36.07 billion)
- Net income: ▲CN¥224.8 billion (2025) (US$33.56 billion)
- Total assets: ▲CN¥1.92 trillion (2025) (US$286.35 billion)
- Total equity: ▲CN¥1.12 trillion (2025) (US$167.63 billion)
- Owners: Naspers (25.65%; since 2019 through Prosus)
- Number of employees: ▲115,849 (2025)
- Divisions: Tencent Interactive Entertainment; Tencent Music; Tencent Pictures
- Subsidiaries: iflix; Universal Music Group (20%); List of §Video games companies subsidiaries
- ASN: 132203
- Website: tencent.com

Tencent
- "Tencent" in Simplified (top) and Traditional (bottom) Chinese characters
- Simplified Chinese: 腾讯
- Traditional Chinese: 騰訊
Transcriptions
Standard Mandarin
- Hanyu Pinyin: Téngxùn
- Bopomofo: ㄊㄥˊ ㄒㄩㄣˋ
- Wade–Giles: T'eng^{2}-hsün^{4}
- Tongyong Pinyin: Téng-syùn
- IPA: [tʰə̌ŋ.ɕŷn]
Yue: Cantonese
- Yale Romanization: Tàhngseun
- Jyutping: tang4 seon3
- IPA: [tʰɐŋ˩ sɵn˧]

Tencent Holdings, Ltd.
- Simplified Chinese: 腾讯控股有限公司
- Traditional Chinese: 騰訊控股有限公司
Transcriptions
Standard Mandarin
- Hanyu Pinyin: Téngxùn Kònggǔ Yǒuxiàn Gōngsī
- Bopomofo: ㄊㄥˊ ㄒㄩㄣˋ ㄎㄨㄥˋ ㄍㄨˇ ㄧㄡˇ ㄒㄧㄢˋ ㄍㄨㄥ ㄙ
- Wade–Giles: Teng^{2}-hsün^{4} K'ung^{4}-ku^{3} Yu^{3}-hsien^{4} Kung^{1}-szu^{1}
- Tongyong Pinyin: Téng-syùn Kòng-gǔ Yǒu-siàn Gong-sih
- IPA: [tʰə̌ŋ.ɕŷn kʰʊ̂ŋ.kù jòʊ.ɕjɛ̂n kʊ́ŋ.sɹ̩́]
Yue: Cantonese
- Yale Romanization: Tàhngseun Hunggú Yáuhhaahn Gūngsī
- Jyutping: tang4 seon3 hung3 gu2 jau5 haan6 gung1 si1
- IPA: [tʰɐŋ˩ sɵn˧ hʊŋ˧ ku˧˥ jɐw˩˧ han˨ kʊŋ˥ si˥]

Tencent (Chinese: 腾讯; pinyin: Téngxùn) is a Chinese multinational technology conglomerate and holding company headquartered in Shenzhen. It is one of the highest grossing multimedia companies in the world based on revenue. It is also the world's largest company in the video game industry based on its equity investments. Its associated stock-market-listed variable interest entity Tencent Holdings Ltd is incorporated in the Cayman Islands.

Founded in 1998, its subsidiaries globally market various Internet-related services and products, including in entertainment, artificial intelligence, and other technology. Its twin-skyscraper headquarters, Tencent Seafront Towers (also known as Tencent Binhai Mansion) are based in the Nanshan District of Shenzhen. In December 2023, architect Büro Ole Scheeren unveiled the latest helix-inspired design of Tencent's new global headquarters in Shenzhen. Known as Tencent Helix, it will accommodate more than 23,000 employees across nearly 500,000 square meters.

Tencent is the world's largest video game vendor and one of the largest companies by market capitalization in China. It is among the largest social media, venture capital, and investment corporations. Its services include social networks, music, web portals, e-commerce, mobile games, internet services, payment systems, smartphones, and multiplayer online games. It operates the instant messengers Tencent QQ and WeChat, along with the news site QQ.com. The company surpassed a market value of US$500 billion in 2018, becoming the first Asian technology company to cross this valuation mark. It has since then emerged as the most valuable publicly traded company in China, and is the world's tenth most valuable company by market value as of February 2022. In 2015, 2018, and 2020, the company was ranked by Boston Consulting Group and Fast Company among the 50 most innovative companies worldwide. Tencent has stakes in over 600 companies, and began focusing on tech start-ups in Asia in 2017. TechCrunch characterized Tencent's investment strategy as letting its portfolio startups operate autonomously. Tencent's valuation approached US$1 trillion in January 2021 before it plummeted, but it has since recovered as of November 2025. Tencent Holdings was ranked 35th on the 2023 Forbes Global 2000 list.

== History ==
=== 1998–2010: Founding and growth ===
Tencent was founded by Pony Ma, Zhang Zhidong, Xu Chenye, Charles Chen and Zeng Liqing in November 1998 as Tencent Inc, in the Cayman Islands. The name "Tencent" is based on its Chinese name Tengxun (腾讯), which incorporates part of Pony Ma's Chinese name (Ma Huateng; 马化腾) and literally means "galloping fast information". Initial funding was provided to it by venture capitalists. In February 1999, Tencent's messenger product OICQ was released. Shortly after, Tencent had the client's name changed to QQ; this was said to be due to a lawsuit threat from ICQ and its owner AOL. The company remained unprofitable for the first three years.

South African media company Naspers purchased a 46.5% share of Tencent in 2001. As of 2023, it owns 26.16% through Prosus, which also owns a stake in Tencent's sister companies, such as OLX, VK, Trip.com Group, Delivery Hero, Bykea, Meesho, Stack Overflow, Udemy, Codecademy, Brainly and PayU. Tencent Holding Ltd was listed on the Hong Kong Stock Exchange on 16 June 2004, and it was added as a Hang Seng Index Constituent Stock in 2008.

The company originally derived income solely from advertising and premium users of QQ, who pay monthly fees to receive extras. By 2005, charging for use of QQ mobile, its cellular value-added service, and licensing its penguin character, which could be found on snack food and clothing, had also become income generators. By 2008, Tencent was seeing profit growth from the sale of virtual goods.

In June 2007, Tencent established its charity foundation, becoming the first Chinese internet company to do so.

While Tencent's services have included online gaming since 2004, around 2007/2008, it rapidly increased its offerings by licensing games. While at least two, Crossfire and Dungeon Fighter Online, were originally produced by South Korean game developers, Tencent now makes its own games. On 21 January 2011, Tencent launched Weixin (微信), a social media app. Now branded as WeChat, the app is one of the "super apps", due to its wide range of functions and platforms, and its over 1 billion monthly active users.

=== 2011–2014: Early investments ===
On 18 February 2011, Tencent acquired a majority of equity interest (92.78%) in Riot Games, developer of League of Legends, for about US$230 million. Tencent had already held 22.34% of the equity interest out of a previous investment in 2008. On 16 December 2015, Riot Games sold its remaining equity to Tencent. Tencent acquired a minority stake in Epic Games, developer of franchises like Fortnite, Unreal, Gears of War and Infinity Blade, in June 2012. That year, Tencent acquired ZAM Network, parent of Wowhead and other websites, from Brock Pierce.

Tencent in 2013 increased its stake in Kingsoft Network Technology, a subsidiary of Kingsoft Corporation, to 18%. Tencent previously had a 15.68% stake in the company and raised the stake through a US$46.98 million investment. Tencent took part in Activision Blizzard splitting from Vivendi as a passive investor in 2013 and now owns less than 4.9% of the shares as of 2017. On 17 September 2013, it was announced that Tencent had invested $448 million for a minority share in Chinese search engine Sogou.com, the subsidiary of Sohu, Inc.

On 15 January 2014, Tencent said it would invest HKD 1.5 billion (US$193.45 million) in logistics and warehouse firm China South City Holdings Ltd to develop its e-commerce and logistics business. On 27 February 2014, Tencent purchased a 20% stake in restaurant ratings and group-buying website Dianping for $400 million. On 10 March 2014, Tencent bought a 15% stake in Chinese e-commerce website JD.com Inc. by paying cash and handing over its e-commerce businesses Paipai, QQ Wanggou and a stake in Yixun to JD.com to build a stronger competitor to Alibaba Group.

On 22 May 2014, JD.com got listed on NASDAQ and Tencent expanded its stake in the company to 17.43% on a fully diluted basis by investing an additional US$1,325 million. On 27 March 2014, it was announced that Tencent had agreed to pay about $500 million for a 28 per cent stake in South Korea's CJ Games. On 27 June 2014, Tencent announced that it had agreed to buy a 19.9 per cent stake in Chinese e-commerce website 58.com (WUBA) Inc. for $736 million. On 17 April 2015, Tencent announced it bought an additional $400 million worth of shares, rising its stake in the company to about 25%. On 16 October 2014, via its wholly held subsidiary Hongze Lake Investment Ltd, Tencent announced that it had bought a 7% stake in lottery technology firm China LotSynergy Holdings Ltd for HKD 445.5 million (US$57.4 million).

On 23 October 2014, Tencent pitched in $145 million for a 10 per cent stake in Koudai Gouwu, a Chinese mobile shopping portal. In November 2014, the company announced a deal with HBO which would give it exclusive rights for distribution in China. On 9 December 2014, Chinese taxi-hailing app Didi Dache announced that it had raised more than $700 million in a funding round led by Tencent and Singaporean state investment firm Temasek Holdings. On 29 December 2014, Tencent launched the website for WeBank (China), China's first online-only bank. Trials for the service commenced on 18 January 2015.

In 2014, Tencent sued its major competitor NetEase alleging copyright infringement. Tencent used its leverage from the suit to convince NetEase to sublicense music rights from Tencent. The sub-licensing arrangement that resulted then became a model used by other online music platforms in China.

=== 2015–2020: Continued investments ===
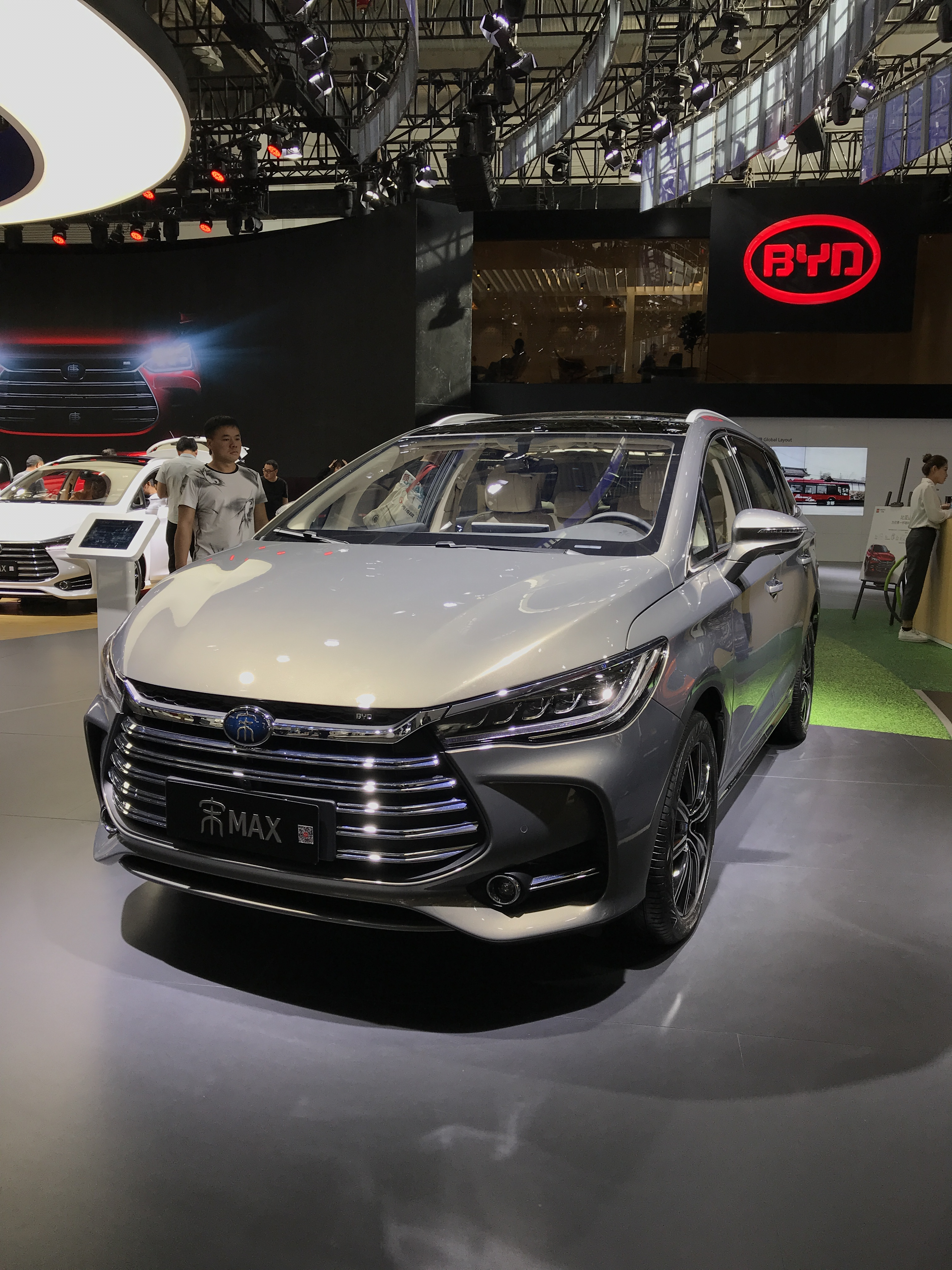
BYD, one of the chief corporate sponsors for Tencent

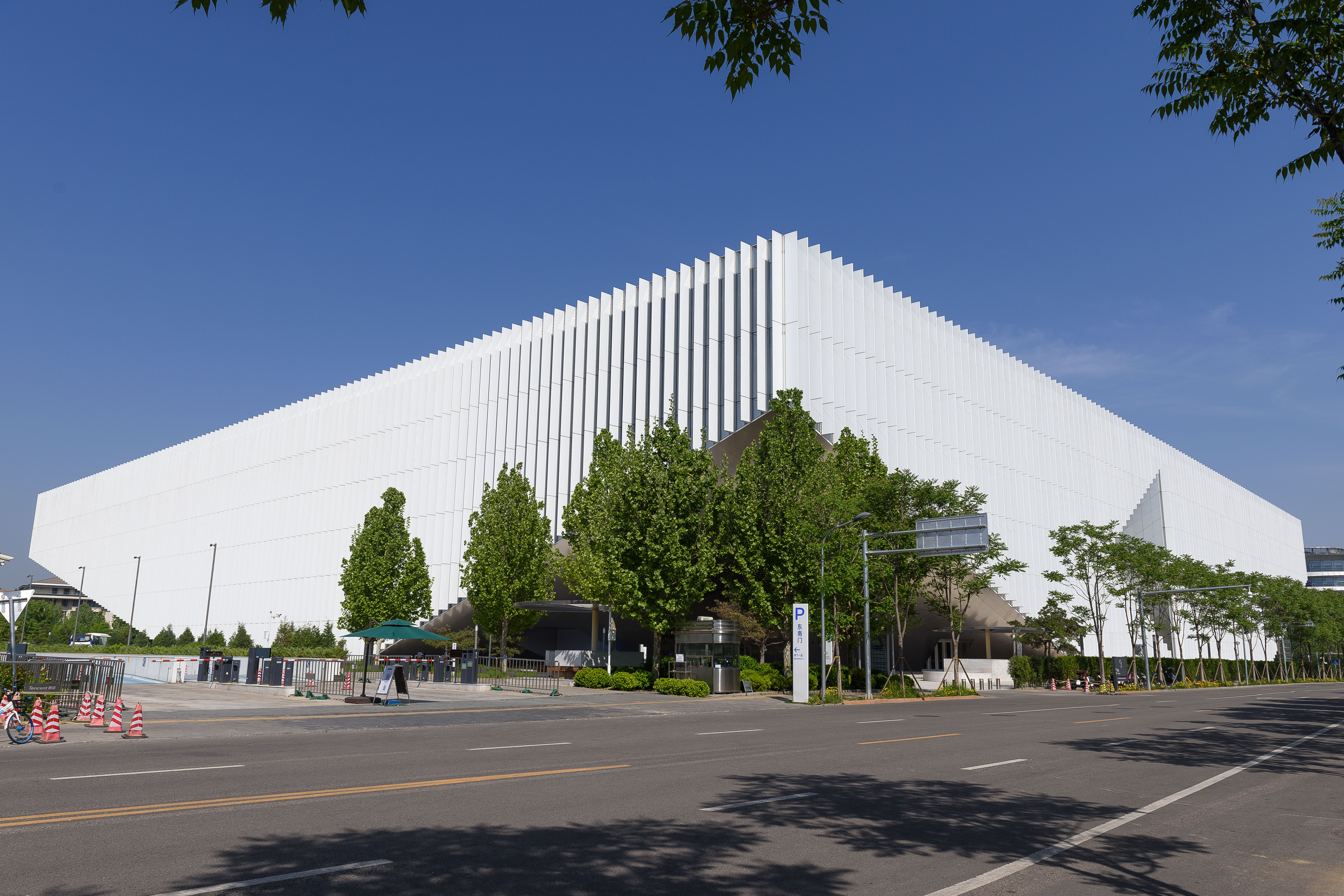
Tencent Beijing office, completed in the late 2010s

On 30 January 2015, Tencent announced that it had signed a US$700 million deal with the National Basketball Association to stream American basketball games in China. Later that year, Chinese automaker BYD became the chief corporate sponsor for Tencent's NBA broadcasts. On 21 June 2016 Tencent announced a deal to acquire 84.3% of Supercell, developer of Clash of Clans, with US$8.6 billion. In July 2016, Tencent acquired a majority stake in China Music Corporation.

In August 2015, a partnership between Tencent and Sensewhere.

Private enterprises in China are required to have an in-firm committee or branch of the Chinese Communist Party (CCP) if three or more CCP members are among their employees. In 2016, Tencent's CCP branch was recognized as one of the one hundred best such branches in the country. It provides communications and education platforms including a CCP activity hall, WeChat channel, and an intranet for CCP members where they can take classes related to government and party policies. The Tencent Party Member Activity Center has a dedicated CCP member activity area of more than 6,000 square meters. More than 1 million yuan is allocated for CCP activities per year.

In 2016, Tencent, together with Foxconn and luxury-car dealer Harmony New Energy Auto founded Future Mobility, a car startup (now defunct) that aimed to sell all-electric fully autonomous premium cars. On 28 March 2017, Tesla, Inc. announced Tencent had purchased a 5% stake in Tesla for US$1.78 billion, the automotive control systems of which it subsequently successfully performed penetration-testing until 2019.

In a "direct challenge to Chinese search engine Baidu," in May 2017, Tencent entered news feed and search functions for its WeChat app, which the Financial Times reported was used by 770 million people at the time.

In May 2017, Tencent surpassed Wells Fargo to enter the world's top 10 most valuable companies. Tencent has also entered an agreement with the Wuhu City Council to build the world's first eSports town in the city, which comprises an eSports theme park, eSports university, a cultural and creative park, an animation industrial park, creative block, tech entrepreneurial community and Tencent Cloud's data centre. The site will be used for the education and accommodation of future eSports players, as well as hosting national eSports events and serving as a hub for Tencent's game development. Aside from Wuhu, another eSports theme park is planned in Chengdu.

In June 2017, Tencent became the 8th most valuable company in BrandZ's Top 100 Most Valuable Global Brands, signalling its growing influence globally as well as the rise of Chinese brands. Alibaba overtook Tencent as Asia's most valuable company as its stocks surged after the company hosted its 2017 Investor's day. The company has also developed its own voice assistant Xiaowei, and was in the midst of discussion to acquire Rovio Entertainment, the developer of Angry Birds. At the same time, Tencent introduced its mini-programs feature that allows smartphone users to access mobile apps across the globe on WeChat without downloading them.

In July 2017, Tencent bought a 9% share in Frontier Developments, the creator of the Elite: Dangerous and Planet Coaster franchises; as well as developer for Rollercoaster Tycoon 2 & 3. In August 2017, after Tencent announced the second quarter 2016 financial report, the stock price rose by 6.2% in the Hong Kong stock market, and the market value reached US$429 billion. Tencent became the second Asian company after Alibaba Group to surpass US$400 billion market cap. Tencent has also created an alliance to its own AI self-driving program, similar to Baidu's Apollo Project, recruiting numerous industry players in the automotive industry. It is also collaborating with L'Oréal, the world's largest cosmetics company, to explore digital marketing under the Joint Business Partnership (JBP) agreement.

According to a report by Sina Tech in October 2017, Tencent employed over 7,000 members of the Chinese Communist Party (CCP) and that CCP members took a leading role in the development of WeChat. "With over 7,000 CCP members, accounting for approximately 23% of the total workforce, and more than 60% of whom are core technical personnel, the number of CCP members at Tencent is increasing by nearly a thousand every year. In Tencent, a leading internet company, CCP members are becoming the main driving force in shaping the company's development direction."

In November 2017, Tencent revealed that it had purchased a 12% stake in Snap Inc. in the open market, with plans to help establish Snapchat as a gaming platform. Tencent remained the largest video game publisher in the world by revenue, and had a market capitalisation of around $475 billion. In the same month, Tencent announced that WeChat reached 980 million monthly active users, and said to be earmarking billions of dollars to amass a catalogue of user-generated content, in competition with YouTube. The company became the first Asian company to cross US$500 billion valuation, surpassing Facebook to enter the top 5 list of the world's biggest firms.

In January 2018, Tencent and The Lego Group, the world's largest toy company, teamed up to jointly develop online games and potentially a social network aimed at children. It also launched its first unmanned shop in Shanghai. Tencent led a US$5.2 billion investment in Wanda Commercial, together with JD.com, Sunac and Suning Group, to acquire shares in the conglomerate. Wanda Commercial was renamed Wanda Commercial Management Group. Tencent bought a 5% to 10% minority stake in Skydance Media. On 23 January 2018, Tencent and Carrefour reached strategic co-operation agreement in China.

On 15 August 2018, Tencent reported a profit decline in the second quarter of 2018, ending a growth streak of more than a decade, as investment gains slid and the government's scrutiny of the gaming business weighed on the company. Shares of Tencent fell 3% in morning trade in Hong Kong after the rare drop in quarterly profit was reported, extending a slide that has wiped nearly $50 billion in market value from the company in that week. The sell-off dragged down many other Chinese internet stocks as well. On 6 September 2018, Luckin Coffee signed a strategic cooperation agreement with Tencent.

China's government designated Tencent as one of its "AI champions" in 2018.

In November 2018, Tencent Charity Foundation donated RMB$1 billion to establish the Xplorer Prize award for outstanding young scientists in areas of basic science and cutting-edge technologies.

In October 2019, Tencent began sending out refunds to customers after cancelling the broadcast of NBA games in response to the Houston Rockets general manager Daryl Morey's social media comments in support of protests in Hong Kong.

In May 2020, Tencent purchased the rights to create System Shock 3 and any further sequels from OtherSide Entertainment. On 29 June 2020, Tencent acquired the video-on-demand service iflix in Kuala Lumpur, Malaysia. In September 2020, Tencent picked Singapore as its hub in Asia, joining rivals ByteDance and Alibaba in the race to reinforce their presence closer to home after complications in India and the United States. Lazy Audio was acquired from Shenzhen Lanren Online Technology Co for 2.7 billion yuan in January 2021.

=== 2021–present: Regulatory scrutiny ===
A "plan to merge ... Huya Live and DouYu" occurred during 2021. Tencent later announced too its intention to take DouYu private, in part due to the unsuccessful merger, but also due to lacklustre business performance and disagreements over strategy among company executives. Tencent is currently the largest stakeholder in DouYu with a 37% stake. On 17 December 2021, Tencent announced it had acquired Slamfire Inc. and its subsidiary Turtle Rock Studios, the developer behind Left 4 Dead and Back 4 Blood.

In January 2022, reports emerged that Tencent was one of the major tech conglomerates to receive a fine from the SAMR for failing to report their merger and acquisition (M&A) deals in advance. According to China's antitrust law, official approval is required before the completion of a M&A deal if the combined annual revenue of all entities involved is at least RMB 10 billion (US$1.57 billion), and at least two entities have at least RMB 400 million (US$62.7 million) in annual revenue. Of the 13 deals cited in total by the SAMR, each carried a fine of RMB 500,000 (US$78,700) and Tencent received a total fine of RMB 4.5 million (US$710,000) for its involvement in nine deals.

On 11 January 2022, it was announced that Tencent was in talks to acquire Xiaomi-backed Black Shark, one of the largest gaming smartphone makers in China. The acquisition would have been Tencent's first in a hardware maker and would have overseen Black Shark's transition into a manufacturer of VR headsets to support Tencent's plans for its metaverse business in the future. Reports initially suggested that Black Shark would be acquired for RMB 2.7 billion (US$420 million), although Tencent walked away from the deal due to regulatory scrutiny of metaverse businesses in China.

In June 2022, Tencent posted its slowest revenue gain since going public in 2004, partly caused by a 15% decrease in advertising revenue. The decline was attributed to the pandemic and tighter regulations imposed by the Chinese government. In September 2022, Tencent acquired a 49.9% stake and 5% voting rights in Guillemot Brothers Limited, Ubisoft's parent company. On 16 September 2022, Tencent took a minority stake in Mordhau studio Triternion.

In November 2022, Tencent announced that it would divest the majority of its US$20.3 billion stake in Meituan through a dividend distribution to shareholders, in part due to China's earlier regulatory crackdown on tech giants. In January 2023, OpenSecrets reported that Tencent spent over $6.3 million lobbying the U.S. federal government after coming under greater regulatory scrutiny in 2020. By January 2023, Tencent had sold its share in Tesla.

Majority owned subsidiary China Literature acquired Tencent Animation and Comics in December 2023.

On 22 December 2023, the Chinese government's regulations to curb online gaming cost Tencent $46 Billion in Market Capitalisation. Later, on 27 December 2023, the first of trading after the Chinese government vowed to make improvements to the proposed gaming rules, the firm's stock rose by 5%.

Also in December 2023, Tencent accelerated the pace of buybacks, increasing the pace of daily purchases to about HK$1 billion (with an average of HK$375 million per day) and made a record HK$10 billion share purchase.

In March 2024, the firm uploaded its revenue report for the 4th quarter of the year 2023, recording a surprising 7% rise in the fourth-quarter revenue, slightly missing the expected mark.

In December 2024, Apple decided to have talks with Tencent and TikTok owner ByteDance for integrating their artificial intelligence models into iPhones that are sold in China. In 2025 Tencent released an AI 3D model generator, Hunyuan3D.

On 7 January 2025, Tencent was added to a watchlist of companies allegedly working with China's military, along with CATL.

As of 31 December 2025, Tencent own 11.45% of the Universal Music Group through Tencent Mobility Limited and Tencent Music Entertainment Hong Kong Limited, while sharing 39.9% of voting rights.

In 2026, Tencent increased its investment in artificial intelligence, expanding its AI product portfolio with the OpenClaw suite and developing an AI agent for its WeChat platform.

== Finances ==
The key trends for Tencent are (as of the financial year ending 31 December):

	Revenue (CNY millions)	Net income (CNY millions)	Total assets (CNY millions)	Employees (k)
2015	102,863	29,108	306,818	
2016	151,938	41,447	395,899	
2017	237,760	72,471	554,672	
2018	312,694	79,984	723,521	54
2019	377,289	95,888	953,986	63
2020	482,064	160,125	1,333,425	86
2021	560,118	227,810	1,612,364	113
2022	554,552	188,709	1,578,131	108
2023	609,015	118,048	1,577,246	105
2024	660,257	196,467	1,780,995	111
2025	751,766	229,801	2,038,986	116

== Products and services ==
Sales by business segment (2024)
Business	share
Gaming	48.34%
Fintech and Business services	32.10%
Marketing services	18.38%
Other	1.18%

=== Social media ===
Launched in February 1999, Tencent QQ is Tencent's first and most notable product, QQ is one of the most popular instant messaging platforms in its home market. As of 31 December 2010, there were 647.6 million active Tencent QQ IM user accounts, making Tencent QQ the world's largest online community at the time. The number of QQ accounts connected simultaneously has, at times, exceeded 100 million. While the IM service itself is free, a fee was being charged for mobile messaging as of 2006. Tencent also created QQ International, which is an English version of QQ that allows communication with mainland accounts; QQi is available for Windows and macOS. In 2005, Tencent launched Qzone, a social networking/blogging service integrated within QQ. Qzone has become one of the largest social networking services in China, with a user base of 645 million in 2014.

On 10 April 2010, Tencent launched Tencent Weibo, a now defunct microblogging service.

WeChat is a mobile app with functions such as voice- and text messaging, mobile payment, and a friends-only social network called Moments. It is the most popular social mobile application in China and some overseas Chinese communities, for instance, Malaysia. As of 2017, WeChat has been unsuccessful in penetrating major international markets outside of China.

=== Entertainment ===
==== Video games ====
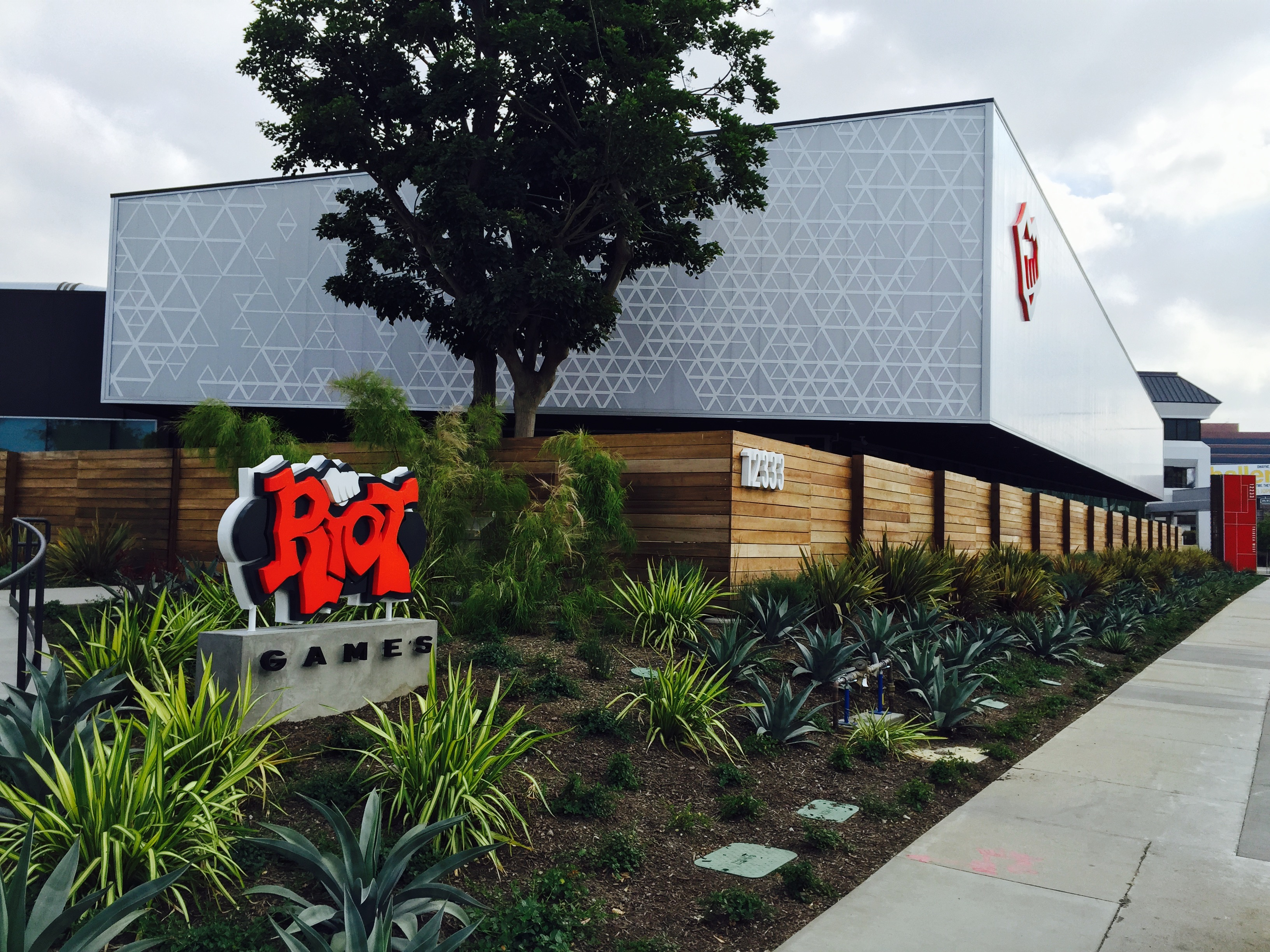
Riot Games is one of Tencent's notable subsidiaries, known for creating the multiplayer online battle arena game League of Legends. It is one of the first game developers to receive investment from Tencent.

Tencent publishes video games via its Tencent Games division of Tencent Interactive Entertainment. It has five internal studio groups under it: TiMi Studio Group, LightSpeed Studios, Aurora Studio Group, Morefun Studio and Next Studio.

Outside of companies subsidiary of its game division, Tencent as a whole has many major and minor investments in domestic and, since the 2010s, foreign game companies.

===== Foreign video game assets =====
Company	Location	First investment date	As of date	Ownership stake	Ref(s).
Funcom	Oslo, Norway	September 2019	January 2020	Wholly-owned	
Leyou (Athlon Games, Digital Extremes)	Hong Kong	December 2020		Wholly-owned	
Riot Games	Los Angeles, United States	September 2009	December 2015	Wholly-owned	
Sharkmob	Malmö, Sweden	March 2019		Wholly-owned	
Sumo Group	Sheffield, United Kingdom	November 2019	January 2022	Wholly-owned	
Grinding Gear Games	Auckland, New Zealand	May 2018	March 2024	Wholly-owned	
Visual Arts (Key, KineticNovel)	Osaka, Japan	July 2023		Wholly-owned	
Klei Entertainment	Vancouver, Canada	January 2021		Wholly-owned	
Turtle Rock Studios	Lake Forest, United States	December 2021		Wholly-owned	
Wake Up Interactive (Soleil, Valhalla Game Studios)	Hong Kong	November 2021		Wholly-owned	
Inflexion Games	Edmonton, Canada	February 2022		Wholly-owned	
Yager Development	Berlin, Germany	February 2020	June 2021	Wholly-owned	
Fatshark	Stockholm, Sweden	January 2019	January 2021	Wholly-owned	
Miniclip	Neuchâtel, Switzerland	February 2015		Wholly-owned	
10 Chambers Collective	Stockholm, Sweden	October 2020		Majority	
Fulqrum Publishing	Prague, Czech Republic	February 2022		Majority	
Techland	Wrocław, Poland	24 July 2023		Majority	
Supercell	Helsinki, Finland	June 2016		Majority	
Don't Nod	Paris, France	January 2021	February 2023	42%	
Pocket Gems	San Francisco, United States	2015	May 2017	38%	
Shift Up	Seoul, South Korea	December 2022		35.03%	
Ubisoft	Paris, France	March 2018	March 2025	34.9%	
Epic Games	Cary, United States	June 2012		28%	
Vantage Studios	Paris, France	2025		26.3%	
Bloober Team	Kraków, Poland	October 2021		22%	
Sea Ltd (Garena)	Singapore	2010	January 2022	18.7%	
Netmarble	Seoul, South Korea	September 2018		17.66%	
FromSoftware	Tokyo, Japan	August 2022		16.25%	
Remedy Entertainment	Helsinki, Finland	May 2021		14%	
Krafton (Bluehole Studio)	Seongnam-si, South Korea	August 2018		13.87%	
Kakao	Jeju City, South Korea	May 2012		13.54%	
Paradox Interactive	Stockholm, Sweden	March 2016		10.07%	
Frontier Developments	Cambridge, United Kingdom	July 2017		9%	
Kadokawa Corporation	Tokyo, Japan	October 2021		6.86%	

Other notable investments include Discord (February 2015), Roblox Corporation (February 2020), Lockwood Publishing (November 2020), PlatinumGames (January 2020), Aiming (December 2014), Novarama (March 2022), Triternion (September 2022) Riffraff Games (March 2022), Offworld Industries (March 2022), Bohemia Interactive (February 2021), Payload Studios (February 2021), Playtonic Games (November 2021), Voodoo (August 2020), Lighthouse Games (July 2023) and Mundfish (January 2021).

===== Former foreign stakes =====
- Tencent became the majority shareholder of Tequila Works in March 2022, which filed for insolvency in November 2024.
- Tencent had a 14.46% stake in Glu Mobile before Glu was acquired by Electronic Arts in 2019.
- Tencent had invested in Playdots, which was acquired by Take-Two Interactive in August 2020.
- Tencent invested in Activision Blizzard as a minority investor with 5% in 2013, when the holding company bought itself from the Vivendi conglomerate which was part of it since 2008.
- Tencent's Sumo Group subsidiary wholly owned Pipeworks Studios until it was sold to Jagex for an undisclosed sum in July 2022.
- Tencent had 20% of Marvelous shares bought in 2020 and in 2026 it sold off those shares back.

===== Chinese company investments =====
- 15.1% ownership of electric vehicle manufacturer Nio in 2020
- 20% ownership of Wangyuan Shengtang, which publishes, among others, the GuJian franchise (2021). Stake increased to 94% in 2024.
- 51.4% of Kuro Games, which publishes Wuthering Waves (2024)
- 18.6% ownership of iDreamSky, which mainly develops and publishes mobile games for the Chinese market
- 5% ownership of Century Huatong, which operates games developed by FunPlus. Tencent became a shareholder through an investment in Century Huatong's subsidiary Shengqu Games.
- 5% ownership of Game Science, responsible for the development of Black Myth: Wukong (2021)
- 19.5% ownership of Bluepoch, responsible for Reverse: 1999 (2023)
- 26.34% ownership of S-Game, responsible for Phantom Blade Zero

==== Television and cinema ====
In April 2009, Tencent launched iTQQ, a "smart interactive television service" in a joint effort with TCL.

In 2015, Tencent launched Tencent Pictures (Chinese: 腾讯影业), a film distributor and a production company that creates and distributes films based on books, comic books, animated series and video games. In the same year, Tencent launched Tencent Penguin Pictures (Chinese: 腾讯企鹅影视) a production unit focusing on online dramas and minor investments in feature films. It is under the Online Media Business Unit at Tencent and works closely with Tencent Video.

==== Comics ====
On 21 March 2012, Tencent launched Tencent Comic, and would later become China's largest online animation platform.

In September 2017, Tencent has announced plans to introduce Chinese online comics to every market around the world, with the first being North America. In 2019, it sold its department of literature and comics to Pingzhi Information.

==== Music ====
In 2014, Tencent established exclusive in-China distribution agreements with several large music producers, including Sony, Warner Music Group and YG Entertainment and in 2017 it signed a deal with Universal Music Group to stream its music in China. It also entered a partnership with Alibaba Group on music-streaming rights sharing. The deal aims to protect licensed streaming services offering copyrighted content of the music industry, encouraging more high-quality and original music, as well as developing China's fast-growing streaming market. Alibaba will gain the rights to stream music from international labels, which already have exclusive deals with Tencent, in return for offering reciprocal rights to its catalogue of Chinese and Japanese music. The deal between Alibaba and Tencent was an exchange of music licensing that let each company grow its streaming catalogue but at a lower cost. Tencent sub-licensed songs from Universal, Sony, and Warner to Alibaba's Ali Music, while Alibaba shared rights to Chinese and Japanese music from labels like Rock Records, HIM international, B'in Music, and Media Asia. The deal aimed at reducing fragmentation, support paid subscriptions and promote higher-quality original music in China. It also indicated a shift towards broader access.

In December 2017, Tencent's music arm, Tencent Music Entertainment (TME), and Spotify agreed to swap a 10% stake in each other's music businesses, forming an alliance in the music industry which Martin Lau (president of Tencent) described as a "strategic collaboration".

In October 2019, Tencent Music reached a streaming music distribution agreement with CD Baby and TuneCore to provide independent music artists who distribute music through CD Baby and TuneCore access to the Chinese music market through Tencent's music streaming services QQ Music, KuGou, and Kuwo.

In March 2020, Tencent acquired 10% of Vivendi's stake in Universal Music Group, the world's largest music group. In addition, it was given the option to buy another 10% with the same conditions.

In June 2020, Tencent bought 1.6% of Warner Music Group's shares after WMG launched its IPO in the same month.

On 27 May 2025, Hybe Corporation announced it would sell all of its shares in SM Entertainment to Tencent Music.

==== Video streaming ====
In June 2011, Tencent launched Tencent Video, a video streaming website. It also controls the live-streaming platform Huya Live and has stakes in other major Chinese game live-streaming platform operators, including DouYu, Kuaishou and Bilibili. In March 2020, Tencent started testing Trovo Live, a live-streaming service for worldwide users. Since June 2020, it owns the Malaysian Video-on-demand service Iflix.

==== Virtual reality ====
In late April 2017, Tencent announced it was preparing to launch its virtual reality headset that year.

=== E-commerce ===
In September 2005, Tencent launched PaiPai.com (Chinese: 拍拍; pinyin: pāi pāi), a C2C auction site. In addition to PaiPai.com, Tencent launched TenPay, an online payment system similar to PayPal, which supports B2B, B2C, and C2C payments. TenPay was one of the first domestic non-bank payment providers to receive a regulatory license following 2010 People's Bank of China regulations that took non-bank third party payment providers out of a legal grey area.

In response to the dominance of the Chinese e-commerce market by Tencent competitor Alibaba Group, Tencent took great effort in its e-commerce platforms. On 10 March 2014, Tencent bought a 15 per cent stake in Chinese e-commerce website JD.com Inc. by paying cash and handing over its e-commerce businesses Paipai.com, QQ Wanggou, and a stake in Yixun to JD.com, as well as purchasing a stake in e-commerce website 58 Tongcheng. In accordance to this agreement, JD.com would receive exclusive access to Tencent's WeChat and MobileQQ platforms. In May 2014, JD became the first Chinese e-commerce company to be listed on the NASDAQ exchange, under its ticker 'JD'. Competition was apparent most recently when, in February 2026, as the Year of the Horse was celebrated for Chinese New Year, AI and e-commerce companies such as Alibaba and Tencent handed out prizes, including luxury cars and cash, to customers to try out their AI apps like Qwhen and Tencent's WeChat Yuanbao model. Customers were offered red envelopes with prizes of up to CNY 10,000 and $1,450. Companies saw this moment as an opportunity to capture AI-curious customers. Some companies like Alibaba saw such a high demand that they had to add resources in order to end outages on its Qwen app.

On 31 December 2015, JD announced that they will stop supporting services on Paipai.com after being unable to deal with issues involving fake goods, and had integrated the Paipai.com team within its other e-commerce platforms. In a 3-month transitional period, Paipai.com would be fully shut down by 1 April 2016. JD relaunched PaiPai.com as PaiPai Second Hand (拍拍二手) to compete alongside 58 Tongcheng's Zhuanzhuan.com, both partially owned by Tencent, against Alibaba's Xianyu in the second-hand e-commerce market.

Tencent was reported in 2017 to be working with China's Central Bank to develop a central payments clearing platform for online payments.

On 31 December 2021, it was reported Tencent had bought a stake in the UK digital bank, Monzo.

=== Utility software ===
In March 2006, Tencent launched its search engine Soso.com (搜搜; to search). On 1 October 2012, it was the 33rd most visited website in the world, 11th most visited in China, as well as the 8th most visited website in South Korea, according to Alexa Internet. It was also a Chinese partner of Google, using AdWords. In September 2013, Tencent discontinued Soso.com after it invested in Sogou and replaced Soso.com with Sogou Search as its main search engine.

In 2008, Tencent released a media player, available for free download, under the name QQ Player. Tencent also launched Tencent Traveler, a web browser based on Trident. It became the third most-visited browser in China in 2008.

QQ Haiwai is Tencent's first venture into international real estate listings and information and is the result of a partnership with Chinese international real estate website Juwai.com. Haiwai was announced at Tencent's annual regional summit in Beijing on 21 December 2016.

In 2017, Tencent launched its own credit score system called Tencent Credit, with a process similar to that of Sesame Credit, operated by its competitor, the Alibaba Group, through its subsidiary Ant Financial.

=== Healthcare and insurance ===
Tencent has created WeChat Intelligent Healthcare, Tencent Doctorwork, and AI Medical Innovation System (AIMIS) Tencent Doctorwork has also merged with Trusted Doctors

Tencent officially commences operations of its first insurance agency platform, WeSure Internet Insurance Ltd. (WeSure), to work with domestic insurance companies such as Ping An Insurance.

In August 2017, Tencent released AI Medical Innovation System (AIMIS) or Miying (觅影), which has two core competencies: AI medical imaging and AI-assisted diagnosis. The AI Medical Innovation System (AIMIS) is capable of helping doctors screen for various diseases, such as diabetic retinopathy, lung cancer, and esophageal cancer, through its AI-assisted medical image analysis. Its AI-assisted medical diagnosis engine enables doctors to identify and estimate the risk of over 700 diseases, thereby improving the accuracy and efficiency of diagnoses. The system is currently undergoing clinical validation in more than 100 major hospitals in China. It has already assisted doctors in interpreting over 100 million medical images and has served nearly one million patients. Tencent's data indicates that recognition accuracy reaches 90% for esophageal cancer, 97% for diabetic retinopathy, and 97.2% for colorectal cancer. Overall, Chinese medical institutions and companies are adopting a proactive approach toward AI. Nearly 80% of hospitals and medical enterprises plan to implement or have already implemented medical AI applications, and more than 75% of hospitals believe that these applications will become widespread in the future.

During the COVID-19 pandemic, Tencent helped source 1.2 million protective masks for American medical staff combating the virus.

=== Data processing ===
On 27 March 2020, a co-innovation lab was launched by Tencent who will be in collaborations with Huawei in developing a cloud-based game platform by tapping into Huawei's Kunpeng processor's power to build Tencent's GameMatrix cloud game platform. Along with further exploration in the possibilities of artificial intelligence and augmented reality elements in game.

In October 2020, Tencent's AIMIS Image Cloud was introduced. AIMIS Image Cloud was designed to help patients manage their medical images and give permission to medical professionals to access their exams and reports. The AIMIS platform supports full images on the cloud to reduce repeated exams. It can also connect medical institutions at all levels through cloud based Picture Archiving and Communication Systems (PACS), allowing patients to take examinations in primary medical institutions and obtain expert diagnosis remotely. Doctors can conduct online consultations through Tencent real-time audio and video facilities when they encounter difficult cases and work collaboratively on images to communicate more efficiently.

On 26 May 2020, Tencent announced it planned to invest 500 billion yuan (US$70 billion) over the next five years in new digital infrastructure, a major hi-tech initiative that would bolster Beijing's efforts to drive economic recovery in the post-coronavirus era.

Tencent debuted its Tencent Hy line of large language models in September 2023. After a preview release in April 2026, the company's open-weights Hy3 model was made available under the Apache License in July 2026. Tencent previewed its Hy4 model in August 2026.

=== Accessibility ===
Tencent received the Zero Project Award 2023 for innovative ICT solutions for persons with disabilities. Originating from Tencent's game development, MTGPA (Magic Tencent Game Performance Amelioration) Haptics is transmitting vibro-tactile signals to the user which support orientation and notification. Typical customers are persons with visual impairments or the elderly. Connected to the Tencent Map app, MTGPA Haptics guides customers indoors and outdoors through long and short vibrations in case of deviations from the planned route.

=== Other ===
Tencent announced its WeCity project in 2019, through which it seeks to develop a smart city solution for digital governance, urban management and decision-making, and industrial interconnections. In June 2020, Tencent has unveiled plans for an urban development dubbed "Net City", a 21-million-square-foot development, equivalent in size to Monaco, in Shenzhen. The development will be built on reclaimed land. It will prioritize pedestrians, green spaces and self-driving vehicles, corporate offices, schools, sports facilities, parks, retail space and apartments, according to the project's architect, NBBJ.

== Corporate governance ==
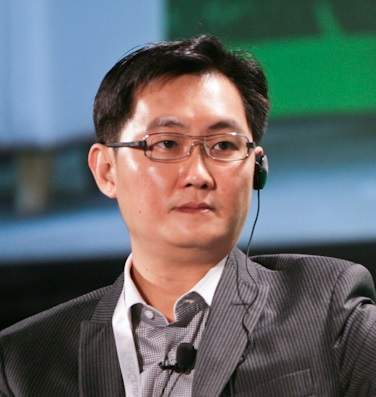
Ma Huateng, also known as Pony Ma, is the main co-founder of Tencent, and is currently the conglomerate's CEO and chairman.

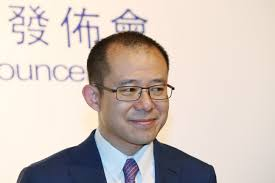
Martin Lau, who helped with the company's IPO as an investment banker at Goldman Sachs, is currently Tencent's president.

Tencent's largest shareholder is Prosus (majority owned by Naspers), which owns 25.6% of all shares and hence is the controlling shareholder. However, Ma Huateng, co-founder of Tencent, still owns a significant stake (8.42%).

Tencent's headquarters is currently the Tencent Binhai Mansion, also known as the Tencent Seafront Towers, which is located in Shenzhen's Nanshan District. In addition to its headquarters in Shenzhen, Tencent also has offices in Beijing, Shanghai, Chengdu, and Guangzhou.

Tencent has a unitary board consisting of Tencent co-founder, CEO, and chairman Ma Huateng, also known as Pony Ma, non-executive directors Jacobus "Koos" Bekker and Charles Searle of Naspers, and independent non-executive directors Li Dongsheng, Ian Stone, Yang Siushun, Ke Yang, and Zhang Xiulan.

=== Subsidiaries ===
Tencent has at least four Wholly Foreign-Owned Enterprises and nearly twenty subsidiaries.

==== Tencent Technology (Shenzhen) Co., Ltd. ====
A software development unit that has created, among others, Tencent Traveler and later versions of QQ IM, as well as some mobile software. This subsidiary is located on the Southern District of Hi-Tech Park, Shenzhen. It also holds a number of patents related to instant messaging and massively multiplayer online game gaming.

==== Shenzhen Yayue Technology ====
In 2023, an entity controlled by the state-owned China Internet Investment Fund took a golden share investment in Shenzhen Yayue Technology. The stock price of Tencent sank when news of the deal was published.

==== Stunlock Studios ====
Stunlock Studios is a Swedish video game developer based in Skövde, founded in 2010, and now majority owned by Tencent. The company is best known for the Battlerite series, which was released in November 2017, and V Rising, released as an early access game in May 2022. In 2019 Tencent bought a 31 percent share of the company, and later became a majority owner in 2021.

=== Research ===
In 2007, Tencent invested over RMB100 million in the establishment of the Tencent Research Institute, which became China's first research centre dedicated to core Internet technologies. The campuses are located in Beijing, Shanghai, and Shenzhen.

In 2012, Tencent launched Tencent YouTu Lab, an AI research department that focuses on computer vision, including optical character recognition (OCR), image understanding, and generation.

In 2020, as part of Tencent's efforts to combat the COVID-19 and future pandemic, Tencent established an AI Joint Lab with respiratory disease expert Zhong Nanshan to conduct research on disease screening, prevention, and outbreak warnings.

In 2023, Tencent debuted its large language model Hunyuan for enterprise use. In 2023, Tencent announced its partnership with the Chinese Academy of Agricultural Sciences (CAAS) to establish a Digital Seed Bank at the Tencent Science and Technology Museum.

=== Chinese government partnerships ===
The Chinese government views Tencent as one of its national champion corporations.

For the occasion of the 19th National Congress of the Chinese Communist Party, Tencent released a mobile game titled "Clap for Xi Jinping: An Awesome Speech", in which players have 19 seconds to generate as many claps as possible for the party leader.

In August 2019, it was reported that Tencent collaborated with the propaganda department of the Guangdong Provincial Committee of the Chinese Communist Party and the People's Daily to develop "patriotic games".

In a December 2020 article in Foreign Policy, a former senior official of the Central Intelligence Agency stated that the CIA concluded that Tencent received funding from the Ministry of State Security early on in its foundation. This was said to be a "seed investment" that was provided "when they were trying to build out the Great Firewall and the monitoring technology." Tencent denied this allegation.

In 2021, it was reported that Tencent and Ant Group were working with the People's Bank of China to develop a Central bank digital currency.

In June 2022, Tencent partnered with Shanghai United Media Group to launch a plan to develop domestic and foreign influencers.

=== Environmental ===
Tencent participates in many carbon reduction programs and partnerships. Tencent's Global Carbon Neutral Technology Alliance shares carbon neutrality patents and technologies for free and includes competitors like Alibaba and Microsoft. Tencent's CarbonX Program is a business accelerator and digital capability program which aims to develop low-carbon technologies. In December 2022, Tencent launched TanLIVE, a climate a co-developed platform which aims to bring together resources for climate change solutions in China.

Tencent participates in the Science Based Targets initiative launched by the UN Global Compact, which provides a platform for setting science-based net-zero targets. In 2022, Tencent established a goal of making the company and its supply chain carbon neutral.

== Controversies ==
=== Allegations of copying ===
Many of Tencent's software and services share similarities to those of competitors, and to their own. The founder and chairman, Huateng "Pony" Ma, famously said, "[To] copy is not evil." A former CEO and president of SINA.com, Wang Zhidong, said, "Pony Ma is a notorious king of copying." Jack Ma of Alibaba Group stated, "The problem with Tencent is the lack of innovation; all of their products are copies."

In 1996, an Israeli company named Mirabilis released one of the first stand alone instant messaging clients named ICQ. Three years later, Tencent released a copied version of ICQ, naming it OICQ, which stands for Open ICQ. After losing a lawsuit against AOL, which bought ICQ in 1998, for violating ICQ's intellectual property rights, Tencent released a new version of OICQ in December 2000 and rebranded it QQ. With its model of free-to-use and charging for customizing personal avatars, QQ hit 50 million users in its second year, 856 million users and at most 45.3 million synchronous users in 2008.

During early stages of company development and expansion, Tencent has been widely accused of stealing ideas from its competitors and creating counterfeit copies of their products. Some of the criticisms aimed at Tencent in this regard are that QQ farm was a direct copy of Happy Farm, QQ dance originated from Audition Online, and that QQ speed featured gameplay highly similar to Crazyracing Kartrider. In January 2023, Tencent's trailer for their new MMORPG, Tarisland, was said to resemble Blizzard's World of Warcraft. In July 2025, Tencent had been sued by Sony Interactive Entertainment because one of their games Light of Motiram heavily resembled Horizon Zero Dawn in terms of setting, protagonist, storyline, themes and gameplay. In December 2025, Sony and Tencent agreed to a 'Confidential Settlement' after which the game dispersed from online distribution.

=== Tencent's acquisitions ===
In general, Tencent does not seek to acquire controlling stakes when it invests in other companies. It usually deems minority ownership sufficient to build connections and acquire technology.

In a partial effort to rebuild the reputation of Tencent lost from allegations of copying, Tencent adjusted its strategy by aggressively investing in the acquisition of other companies, rather than in the replication of them. By 2020, Tencent had invested in over 800 companies across the world. During 2012 and 2019, under the direction of President Martin Lau, Tencent has invested from minority stakes to majority stakes in world-wide-famous game companies such as Riot Games, Epic Games, Activision Blizzard, SuperCell, and Bluehole. While aggressive acquisitions may benefit Tencent due to factors such as reduction in competition and monopolization, it may not benefit the acquired companies in terms of their growth and innovation. Colin Huang, founder of Pinduoduo, said "Tencent won't die when Pinduoduo dies, because it has tens of thousands of sons."

=== Security concerns ===
In 2015, security testing firms AV-Comparatives, AV-TEST and Virus Bulletin jointly decided to remove Tencent from their software whitelists. The Tencent products supplied for testing were found to contain optimisations that made the software appear less exploitable when benchmarked but actually provided greater scope for delivering exploits. Additionally, software settings were detrimental to end-users protection if used. Qihoo was later also accused of cheating, while Tencent was accused of actively gaming the anti-malware tests.

The United States Department of Defense added Tencent to its list of entities associated with the Chinese military in January 2025; such companies are either considered to be either controlled by the Chinese military or serve the growth of China's civil-military complex. Following the listing, Tencent representatives said it was "clearly a mistake", would have no impact on the company's business, and said they planned to appeal the listing.

The updated Section 1260H list published in June 2026 also included Tencent. Under U.S. law, the Department of Defense is prohibited from contracting directly with companies on the list beginning 30 June 2026, with restrictions on purchases through third parties taking effect in 2027.

=== Major litigation ===
Since 2018, Tencent has been in litigation with ByteDance. ByteDance and its affiliates brought a series of unfair competition lawsuits against Tencent, alleging that Tencent was blocking their content. As of at least early 2024, these lawsuits had not reached resolution, largely due to disputes about jurisdiction. Tencent filed two lawsuits against ByteDance and its affiliates, alleging that they were using WeChat and QQ profiles without authorization and illegally crawling data from public WeChat accounts. Tencent obtained an injunction barring ByteDance from this practice.

=== Censorship ===
Tencent's WeChat platform has been accused of blocking TikTok videos and the censorship of politically sensitive content. In April 2018, TikTok sued Tencent and accused it of spreading false and damaging information on its WeChat platform, demanding RMB 1 million in compensation and an apology. In June 2018, Tencent filed a lawsuit against Toutiao and TikTok in a Beijing court, alleging they had repeatedly defamed Tencent with negative news and damaged its reputation, seeking a nominal sum of RMB 1 million in compensation and a public apology. In response, Toutiao filed a complaint the following day against Tencent for allegedly unfair competition and asking for RMB 90 million in economic losses.

However, Tim Sweeney, the CEO and founder of Epic Games, maker of the popular game Fortnite, tweeted that his company would never follow suit and punish people for expressing their opinions, even though Tencent is a 40% stakeholder in Epic. In a statement, Sweeney said it would "never happen on [his] watch", and emphasized that Epic is an American company, implying that it would not compromise an ethos of free speech to curry favour with Chinese authorities in the pursuit of maximum profit.

Later in October 2019, Tencent announced it would stop broadcasting Houston Rockets NBA games in China due to a tweet made by Daryl Morey, general manager of the Rockets, that was supportive of protestors in the 2019–2020 Hong Kong protests. Although Morey's tweet was hastily deleted, news of it was quickly reported all around the world, and the NBA went on to spend months attempting damage control in China.

In December 2019, the Chinese government ordered Tencent to improve the firm's user data rules for its apps, which regulators regarded to be in violation of censorship rules.

In January 2021, a proposed class action lawsuit was filed in California against Tencent, alleging user censorship and surveillance via WeChat.

In November 2022, Sustainalytics downgraded Tencent to "non-compliant" with the United Nations Global Compact principles due to complicity with censorship.

=== 2020 U.S. executive order on WeChat ===
On 6 August 2020, President Donald Trump signed two executive orders, one directed at TikTok and one at WeChat. The TikTok order dictated that within 45 days from its signing (20 September 2020) that it would ban transactions involving the TikTok app with ByteDance, effectively banning the TikTok app in the United States, under threat of penalty. TikTok sued Trump over the executive order, which was later revoked under Joe Biden's administration, causing the lawsuit to be dismissed in July 2021. The order for WeChat contained the same information but targeting the WeChat app and related transactions for Tencent. In the case of ByteDance, the order would be cancelled should an American company acquire it, which Microsoft had been openly spoken of, but there are unlikely any immediate buyers for Tencent in the U.S. Los Angeles Times reporter Sam Dean affirmed from the White House that this does not affect other facets of Tencent's ownerships in American companies such as with its video game companies.

=== Antitrust concerns ===
In December 2024, the U.S. Department of Justice announced that Tencent had removed two directors from Epic Games' board of directors and relinquished its unilateral right to appoint directors or observers to Epic's board. This action followed concerns that interlocking directorates between the Epic and Tencent boards violated U.S. antitrust law under Section 8 of the Clayton Act.

=== AI agent fleet ===
During October 2026, AI agents operated by Tencent were discovered interacting with Chinese mapping service Amap and attempting to bypass blocking measures placed by Amap. It was noted by the researchers who discovered the fleet that no evidence of cooperation among the agents was found.

== See also ==
- Foxmail
- Pengyou
- QQ Browser
- Tencent Maps
