= Sensewhere =

Sensewhere Ltd.
- Type: privately-held
- Industry: software
- Founded: 2010
- Headquarters: Edinburgh, Scotland

sensewhere Ltd. is a privately held software company based in Edinburgh, Scotland, that develops patented indoor positioning technology for retailers, advertisers and app publishers. The company delivers location information indoors or in tight urban areas where there is no or inaccurate GPS signal using automatic crowdsourcing on mobile phones^{[2]}. It was founded as a spun-out company of the University of Edinburgh in 2010.

The system created by sensewhere relies on trilateration of radiofrequency signals between mobile devices and Wireless Access Points that are inherently present in most large indoor venues around the world. The solution is predominantly advertised as a monetisation tool for games, apps, social networks, mapping, search and enterprises.

In November 2014, the company released its Software Development Kit that provides low power positioning (latitude, longitude, and altitude) using a combination of Global Positioning System GPS, Wi-Fi, Bluetooth and sensor data. The sensor technology uses whatever sensors available on a smart mobile device, such as accelerometers, gyros, and barometers and does not rely on additional hardware installation or manual surveying.

== SDK ==
In November 2014, the company released its latest sensewhere Software Development Kit that provides low power positioning (latitude, longitude and altitude) using a combination of Global Positioning System GPS, Wi-Fi, Bluetooth and sensor data. The sensor technology uses whatever sensors available on a smart mobile device, such as accelerometers, gyros, and barometers and does not rely on additional hardware installation or manual surveying.^{[3]}

In August 2015, sensewhere signed a partnership contract with China’s largest technology company, Tencent and received a cash injection of an unspecified amount to further invest in its software. The solution has since been deployed throughout China generating a vast location database of all major indoor venues across China.

In September 2016, the company integrated Micello's Indoor Context API into its applications including adwhere, a location based advertising solution.

In May 2017, the company launched a location based marketing tool allowing retailers to advertise their products based on information about customers’ physical store visits.

== Partnerships ==
In August 2015, sensewhere signed a partnership contract with China’s largest technology company, Tencent and received a cash injection of an unspecified amount to further invest in its software. The solution has since been deployed throughout China generating a vast location database of all major indoor venues across China.

In June 2016, sensewhere teamed up with TomTom to enable the two companies to conquer GPS black spots and bring location based services indoors.
