= Tencent Binhai Mansion =

Skyscraper in Shenzhen, Guangdong, China

- 腾讯滨海大厦
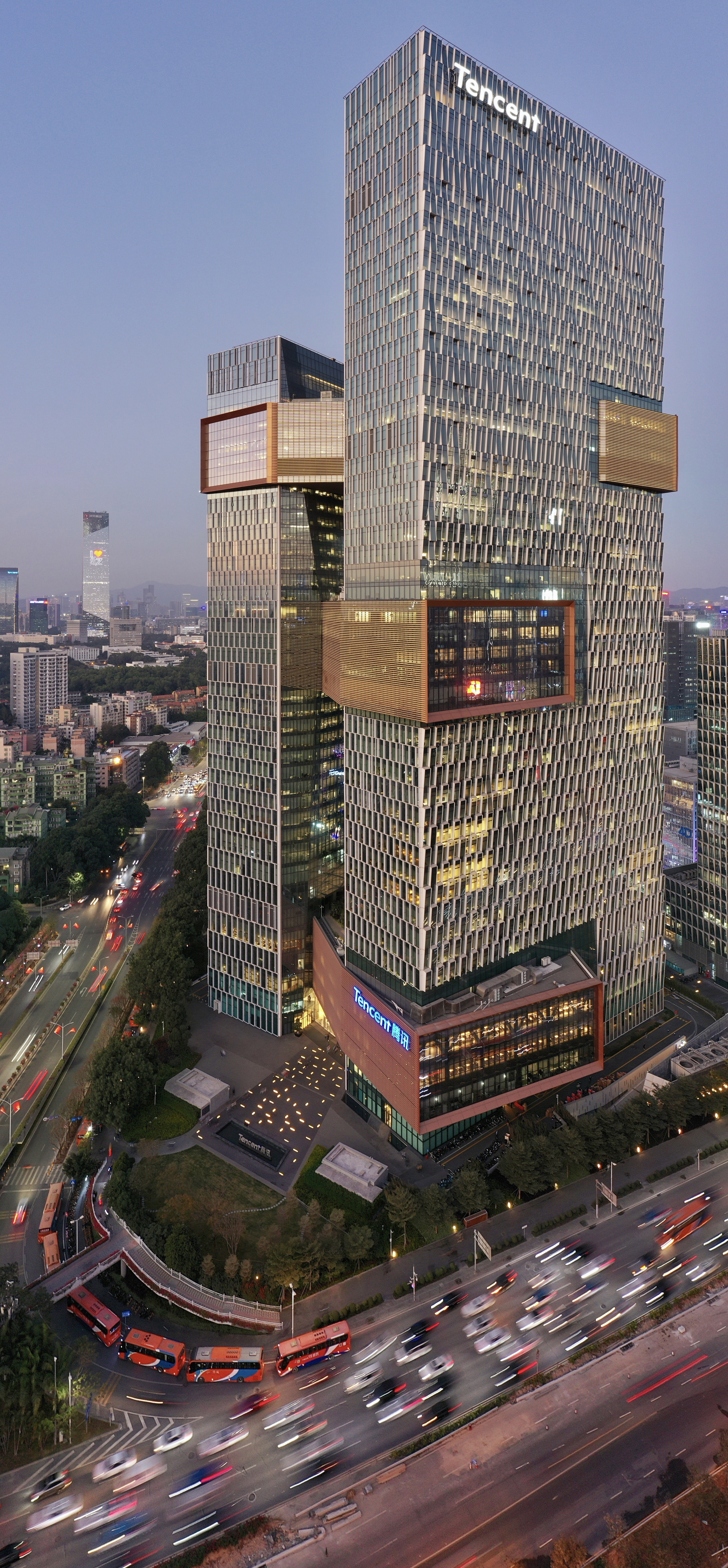
- The Tencent Binhai Mansion in December 2020
- Interactive map of the Tencent Binhai Mansion area
- Alternative names: Tencent Seafront Towers

General information
- Status: Completed
- Type: Office
- Location: 33 Haitian Second Road, Nanshan District, Shenzhen, Guangdong, China
- Coordinates: 22.5255°N 113.9305°E
- Construction started: 2012
- Completed: 2017

Height
- Architectural: 248 metres (813.6 ft) and 194 metres (636.5 ft)

Technical details
- Floor count: 50 and 41

Design and construction
- Architect: NBBJ

Tencent Binhai Mansion
- Simplified Chinese: 腾讯滨海大厦
- Traditional Chinese: 騰訊濱海大廈
Transcriptions
Standard Mandarin
- Hanyu Pinyin: Téngxùn Bīnhǎi Dàshà
Yue: Cantonese
- Jyutping: tang4 seon3 ban1 hoi2 daai6 haa6

Tencent Binhai Mansion (Chinese: 腾讯滨海大厦), or Tencent Seafront Towers, are twin skyscrapers in Houhai, Nanshan District, Shenzhen, China. Construction of the buildings started in 2012. They were topped out in February 2015 and fully completed by the first half of 2017. The buildings are owned by Tencent, one of the largest Chinese technology and Internet companies; the world's largest investment, gaming, and entertainment conglomerate; and Asia's third most valuable company, after TSMC and CXMT. Situated at the intersection of Binhai and Nanhai Boulevards, the buildings stand 248 and 194 meters tall, with 50 and 41 floors respectively. There are three skybridges connecting the two towers.

== Architecture and design ==
Tencent Binhai Mansion was designed with the purpose of connecting people. The two towers are connected using multiple sky walkways with many modern facilities. The architecture of the sky walkways promote employee gathering. The sky walkways include green spaces, fitness areas and public community spaces. Tencent Binhai Mansion is a vertical corporate campus with three vertical corridors, namely the Cultural corridor, the Health corridor and the Knowledge corridor. The building's floors cover a combined 350,000 m^{2}. In 2025 an extensive waterproofing project was completed to ensure the longevity of the building in the humid subtropical south of China.

== Awards and recognition ==
Tencent Binhai Mansion is said to be the smartest building in China because of its use of sophisticated communication technologies. It features digital tour guides, conference rooms that automatically adjust temperatures based on occupancy, and digital alerts for available parking spots before arrival. The building has received two awards for its unique architecture.

== See also ==
- List of tallest buildings in Shenzhen
