= Pony Ma =

Chinese businessman (born 1971)

- 马化腾
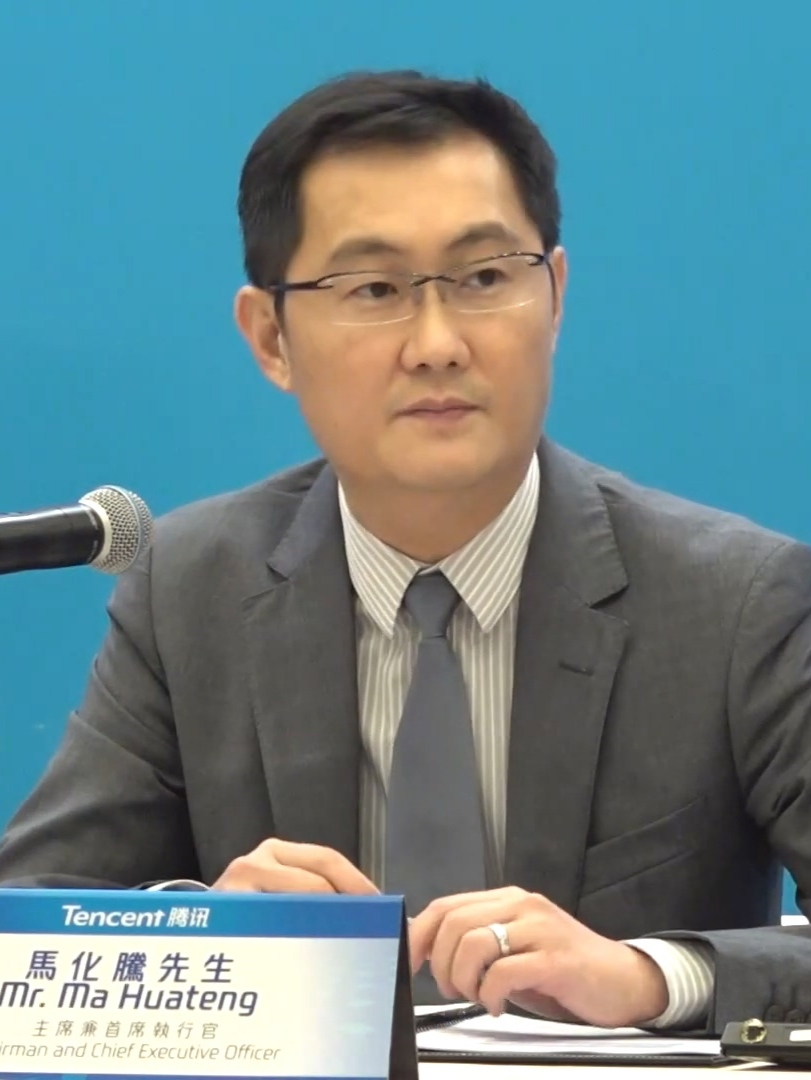
- Ma in 2019
- Born: October 29, 1971 (age 55); Shantou, Guangdong, China
- Other name: Ma Huateng
- Education: Shenzhen University (BS)
- Occupations: Businessman; investor; philanthropist; engineer
- Known for: Co-founder of Tencent
- Title: Chairperson of Tencent

Chinese name
- Simplified Chinese: 马化腾
- Traditional Chinese: 馬化騰
- Hanyu Pinyin: Mǎ Huàténg
- Wade–Giles: Ma Hua-t'eng
- Jyutping: Maa5 Faa3-tang4

Ma Huateng, also known as Pony Ma, (Chinese: 马化腾; pinyin: Mǎ Huàténg, born October 29, 1971) is a Chinese businessman. He is the co-founder, chairman and chief executive officer (CEO) of Tencent, a Shenzhen-based conglomerate in technology, gaming, entertainment, and financial services. In 2007, 2014, and 2018, Time magazine named him one of the world's most influential people, while in 2015, Forbes credited him as one of the world's most powerful people. In 2017, Fortune ranked him as among the top businessmen of the year. Ma was a deputy to the Shenzhen Municipal People's Congress and a delegate in the 12th National People's Congress. As of November 2025, Ma has a net worth of US$63 billion according to Forbes.

== Early life ==
Ma was born in Chaoyang, Shantou, Guangdong. When his father, Ma Chenshu (马陈术), got a job as a port manager in Shenzhen, the young Ma accompanied him. He received a Bachelor of Science degree in Computer Science and Applied Engineering from Shenzhen University in 1993.

== Career ==
=== Founding of Tencent and early career ===
Ma's first job was with China Motion Telecom Development, a supplier of telecommunications services and products, where he was in charge of developing software for pagers. He reportedly earned $176 per month. He also worked for Shenzhen Runxun Communications Co. Ltd. (深圳润迅通讯发展有限公司) in the research and development department for Internet calling services.

Along with four other classmates, Ma Huateng went on to co-found Tencent in 1998. The company's first product came after Ma participated in a presentation for ICQ, the world's first Internet instant messaging service, founded in 1996 by an Israeli company. Inspired by the idea, Ma and his team launched in February 1999 a similar software, with a Chinese interface and a slightly different name: OICQ (or Open ICQ). The product quickly became popular and garnered more than a million registered users by the end of 1999, making it one of the largest such services in China.

In a 2009 interview with China Daily, he stated: "If I have seen further, it is by standing on the shoulders of giants", paraphrasing a quote attributed to Isaac Newton and referencing the similarities between ICQ and OICQ. "We knew our product had a future, but at that time we just couldn't afford it." In order to solve the problem, Ma applied for bank loans and even discussed selling the company.

Since Tencent offered its flagship service OICQ for free, the company sought venture capital to cover its rising operational costs. In 2000, Ma secured funding from U.S. investment firm IDC and Hong Kong telecom carrier Pacific Century CyberWorks (PCCW), which acquired a 40% stake in Tencent for $2.2 million. With the pager market shrinking, Ma improved the messaging platform by allowing OICQ users to send messages to mobile handsets. Afterwards, 80 percent of the company's revenue came from deals struck with telecom operators who agreed to share message fees.

=== AOL arbitration and business expansion ===
After AOL (America Online) bought ICQ in 1998, the company filed an arbitration against Tencent with the National Arbitration Forum in the United States, claiming that OICQ's domain names OICQ.com and OICQ.net were in violation of ICQ's trademark. Tencent lost the case and had to relinquish the domain names. In December 2000, Ma changed the name of the software to QQ ("Q" and "QQ" used to stand for the word "cute").

After the AOL case, Ma decided to expand the business portfolio of Tencent. In 2003, Tencent released its own portal (QQ.com) and made forays into the online games market. By 2004, Tencent became the largest Chinese instant messaging service (holding 74 percent of the market), prompting Ma to list the company on the Hong Kong Stock Exchange. After the company raised $200 million in June's initial public offering (IPO), Ma quickly became one of the richest people in China's telecom industry.

In 2004, Tencent launched an online gaming platform and started selling virtual goods to support the games published on that platform (weapons, gaming power), as well as emoticons and ringtones.

At Ma's behest, Tencent launched in 2005 the C2C platform Paipai.com (拍拍网), a direct competitor to e-commerce giant Alibaba.

Mimicking Microsoft, Ma created two competing teams of engineers in 2010 and charged them with creating a new product. After two months, one team presented an app for text messaging and group chat – WeChat – which launched in January 2011. As of 2015, WeChat (微信, Weixin), is the largest instant messaging platform in the world, used by 48 percent of Internet users in the Asia-Pacific region.

Other diverse services provided by Tencent include web portals, e-commerce, and multiplayer online games.^{[8]} Online games such as Legend of Yulong and Legend of Xuanyuan boosted revenue by more than half, up to US$5.1 billion, with a US$1.5 billion profit margin.

In December 2015, Ma announced that Tencent would build an "internet hospital" set up in Wuzhen that will provide long-distance diagnoses and medicine delivery.

== Other activities ==
=== Philanthropy ===
In 2016, Ma transferred US$2.3 billion worth of his personal Tencent shares to his charitable foundation, the Ma Huateng Global Foundation (马化腾环球基金会).

=== Politics ===
According to the official Tencent website, Ma is a deputy to the 5th Shenzhen Municipal People's Congress and served in the 12th National People's Congress.

Speaking of censorship at a technology conference in Singapore, Ma was quoted as saying: "In terms of information security management, online companies from any country must abide by a defined set of criteria, and act responsibly. Otherwise it might lead to hearsay, libel and argument among citizens—not to mention between countries. That's why the need for online management is increasingly urgent."

== Personal life ==
Ma uses the nickname Pony, derived from the English translation of his family name, Ma (马), which means "horse." Ma Huateng seldom speaks with Western media.

According to the Bloomberg Billionaire Index, a majority of Ma's wealth comes from an 8 percent stake in Tencent Holdings. He reportedly owns property in Hong Kong and art pieces worth US$150 million. He owns a redeveloped palatial residence of 1,820 m^{2} (19,600 sq ft) in Hong Kong.

On April 28, 2018, Ma Huateng's book "China on Fingertips" was officially launched, telling the story of the entire social transformation process of China as a mobile Internet power.
