= Positioning system =

Technology for determining an object's location in space

A positioning system is a system for determining the position of an object in a 3D or 2D space. Positioning system technologies exist ranging from interplanetary coverage with meter accuracy to workspace and laboratory coverage with sub-millimeter accuracy. A major subclass is made of geopositioning systems, used for determining an object's position with respect to Earth, i.e., its geographical position; one of the most well-known and commonly used geopositioning systems is the Global Positioning System (GPS) and similar global navigation satellite systems (GNSS).

== Coverage ==
=== Interplanetary systems ===
Interplanetary-radio communication systems not only communicate with spacecraft, but they are also used to determine their position. Radar can track targets near the Earth, but spacecraft in deep space must have a working transponder on board to echo a radio signal back. Orientation information can be obtained using star trackers.

=== Global systems ===
Global navigation satellite systems (GNSS) allow specialized radio receivers to determine their three-dimensional position, as well as time, with an accuracy of 2–20 metres or tens of nanoseconds. Currently deployed systems use microwave signals that can only be received reliably outdoors and that cover most of Earth's surface, as well as near-Earth space.

The existing and planned systems are:

- Global Positioning System – US military system, fully operational since 1995
- GLONASS – Russian military system, fully operational since October 2011
- Galileo – European Community, fully operational since December 2019
- Beidou navigation system – China, fully operational since June 2020
- Indian Regional Navigation Satellite System – a planned project in India

=== Regional systems ===
Networks of land-based positioning transmitters allow specialized radio receivers to determine their 2-D position on the surface of the Earth. They are generally less accurate than GNSS because their signals are not entirely restricted to line-of-sight propagation, and they have only regional coverage. However, they remain useful for special purposes and as a backup where their signals are more reliably received, including underground and indoors, and receivers can be built that consume very low battery power. LORAN is an example of such a system.

=== Local systems ===
A local positioning system (LPS) is a navigation system that provides location information in all weather, anywhere within the coverage of the network, where there is an unobstructed line of sight to three or more signaling beacons of which the exact position on Earth is known.

Unlike GPS or other global navigation satellite systems, local positioning systems don't provide global coverage. Instead, they use beacons, which have a limited range, hence requiring the user to be near these. Beacons include cellular base stations, Wi-Fi and LiFi access points, and radio broadcast towers.

In the past, long-range LPS's have been used for navigation of ships and aircraft. Examples are the Decca Navigator System and LORAN. Nowadays, local positioning systems are often used as complementary (and in some cases alternative) positioning technology to GPS, especially in areas where GPS does not reach or is weak, for example, inside buildings, or urban canyons. Local positioning using cellular and broadcast towers can be used on cell phones that do not have a GPS receiver. Even if the phone has a GPS receiver, battery life will be extended if cell tower location accuracy is sufficient. They are also used in trackless amusement rides like Pooh's Hunny Hunt and Mystic Manor.

Examples of existing systems include

- Locata Corporation
- Pseudolite

==== Indoor systems ====
Indoor positioning systems are optimized for use within individual rooms, buildings, or construction sites. They typically offer centimeter-accuracy. Some provide 6-D location and orientation information.

Examples of existing systems include

- Active Bat

==== Workspace systems ====
These are designed to cover only a restricted workspace, typically a few cubic meters, but can offer accuracy in the millimeter-range or better. They typically provide 6-D position and orientation. Example applications include virtual reality environments, alignment tools for computer-assisted surgery or radiology, and cinematography (motion capture, match moving).

Examples: Wii Remote with Sensor Bar, Polhemus Tracker, Precision Motion Tracking Solutions InterSense.

==== High performance ====
High performance positioning system is used in manufacturing processes to move an object (tool or part) smoothly and accurately in six degrees of freedom, along a desired path, at a desired orientation, with high acceleration, high deceleration, high velocity and low settling time. It is designed to quickly stop its motion and accurately place the moving object at its desired final position and orientation with minimal jittering.

Examples: high velocity machine tools, laser scanning, wire bonding, printed circuit board inspection, lab automation assaying, flight simulators

== Technologies ==
Multiple technologies exist to determine the position and orientation of an object or person in a room, building or in the world.

=== Time of flight ===
Time of flight systems determine the distance by measuring the time of propagation of pulsed signals between a transmitter and receiver. When distances of at least three locations are known, a fourth position can be determined using trilateration. Global Positioning System is an example.

Optical trackers, such as laser ranging trackers suffer from line of sight problems and their performance is adversely affected by ambient light and infrared radiation. On the other hand, they do not suffer from distortion effects in the presence of metals and can have high update rates because of the speed of light.

Ultrasonic trackers have a more limited range because of the loss of energy with the distance traveled. They are also sensitive to ultrasonic ambient noise and have a low update rate. However, they have an advantage that they do not need line of sight.

Systems using radio waves such as the Global navigation satellite system do not suffer ambient light, but still need line of sight.

=== Spatial scan ===
A spatial scan system uses (optical) beacons and sensors. Two categories can be distinguished:

- Inside out systems where the beacon is placed at a fixed position in the environment and the sensor is on the object
- Outside in systems where the beacons are on the target and the sensors are at a fixed position in the environment

By aiming the sensor at the beacon the angle between them can be measured. With triangulation the position of the object can be determined.

=== Inertial sensing ===
The main advantage of an inertial sensing is that it does not require an external reference. Instead it measures rotation with a gyroscope or position with an accelerometer with respect to a known starting position and orientation. Because these systems measure relative positions instead of absolute positions they can suffer from accumulated errors and therefore are subject to drift. A periodic re-calibration of the system will provide more accuracy.

=== Mechanical linkage ===
This type of tracking system uses mechanical linkages between the reference and the target. Two types of linkages have been used. One is an assembly of mechanical parts that can each rotate, providing the user with multiple rotation capabilities. The orientation of the linkages is computed from the various linkage angles measured with incremental encoders or potentiometers. Other types of mechanical linkages are wires that are rolled in coils. A spring system ensures that the wires are tensed in order to measure the distance accurately. The degrees of freedom sensed by mechanical linkage trackers are dependent upon the constitution of the tracker's mechanical structure. While six degrees of freedom are most often provided, typically only a limited range of motions is possible because of the kinematics of the joints and the length of each link. Also, the weight and the deformation of the structure increase with the distance of the target from the reference and impose a limit on the working volume.

=== Phase difference ===
Phase difference systems measure the shift in phase of an incoming signal from an emitter on a moving target compared to the phase of an incoming signal from a reference emitter. With this the relative motion of the emitter with respect to the receiver can be calculated.

Like inertial sensing systems, phase-difference systems can suffer from accumulated errors and therefore are subject to drift, but because the phase can be measured continuously they are able to generate high data rates. Omega (navigation system) is an example.

=== Direct field sensing ===
Direct field sensing systems use a known field to derive orientation or position: A simple compass uses the Earth's magnetic field to know its orientation in two directions. An inclinometer uses the earth gravitational field to know its orientation in the remaining third direction. The field used for positioning does not need to originate from nature, however. A system of three electromagnets placed perpendicular to each other can define a spatial reference. On the receiver, three sensors measure the components of the field's flux received as a consequence of magnetic coupling. Based on these measures, the system determines the position and orientation of the receiver with respect to the emitters' reference.

=== Optical systems ===
Optical positioning systems are based on optics components, such as in total stations.

=== Magnetic positioning ===
Magnetic positioning is an IPS (Indoor positioning system) solution that takes advantage of the magnetic field anomalies typical of indoor settings by using them as distinctive place recognition signatures. The first citation of positioning based on magnetic anomaly can be traced back to military applications in 1970. The use of magnetic field anomalies for indoor positioning was first claimed in 1999, with later publications related to robotics in the early 2000s.

Most recent applications can employ magnetic sensor data from a smartphone used to wirelessly locate objects or people inside a building.

According to Opus Research magnetic positioning will emerge as a “foundational” indoor location technology.

=== Hybrid systems ===
Because every technology has its pros and cons, most systems use more than one technology. A system based on relative position changes like the inertial system needs periodic calibration against a system with absolute position measurement. Systems combining two or more technologies are called hybrid positioning systems.

Hybrid positioning systems are systems for finding the location of a mobile device using several different positioning technologies. Usually GPS (Global Positioning System) is one major component of such systems, combined with cell tower signals, wireless internet signals, Bluetooth sensors, IP addresses and network environment data.

These systems are specifically designed to overcome the limitations of GPS, which is very exact in open areas, but works poorly indoors or between tall buildings (the urban canyon effect). By comparison, cell tower signals are not hindered by buildings or bad weather, but usually provide less precise positioning. Wi-Fi positioning systems may give very exact positioning, in urban areas with high Wi-Fi density - and depend on a comprehensive database of Wi-Fi access points.

Hybrid positioning systems are increasingly being explored for certain civilian and commercial location-based services and location-based media, which need to work well in urban areas in order to be commercially and practically viable.

Early works in this area include the Place Lab project, which started in 2003 and went inactive in 2006. Later methods let smartphones combine the accuracy of GPS with the low power consumption of cell-ID transition point finding. In 2022, the satellite-free positioning system SuperGPS with higher-resolution than GPS using existing telecommunications networks was demonstrated.

== See also ==
- 3D scanning
- Assisted GPS
- Coordinate-measuring machine
- Dynamic positioning
- Dimensional metrology
- Eye tracking
- Geodesy
- Geolocation
- Handheld tracker
- Indoor positioning system (IPS)
- Mobile phone tracking
- Motion capture
- Multilateration
- Position sensor
- Real-time locating system
- Resection (navigation)
- Surveying
- Virtual reality
- AlterGeo
