= Bluetooth Low Energy beacon =

Hardware transmitter

Bluetooth beacons are hardware transmitters (a class of Bluetooth Low Energy (LE) devices) that broadcast their identifier to nearby portable electronic devices. The technology enables smartphones, tablets and other devices to perform actions when in close proximity to a beacon.

Bluetooth beacons use Bluetooth Low Energy proximity sensing to transmit a universally unique identifier picked up by a compatible app or operating system. The identifier and several bytes sent with it can be used to determine the device's physical location, track customers, or trigger a location-based action on the device such as a check-in on social media or a push notification.

One application is distributing messages at a specific point of interest, for example a store, a bus stop, a room or a more specific location like a piece of furniture or a vending machine. This is similar to previously used geopush technology based on GPS, but with a much reduced impact on battery life and much extended precision.

Another application is an indoor positioning system, which helps smartphones determine their approximate location or context. With the help of a Bluetooth beacon, a smartphone's software can find its approximate location in a store. Brick and mortar retail stores use the beacons for mobile commerce, offering customers special deals through mobile marketing, and can enable mobile payments through point of sale systems.

Bluetooth beacons differ from some other location-based technologies as the broadcasting device (beacon) is only a 1-way transmitter to the receiving smartphone or receiving device, and necessitates a specific app installed on the device to interact with the beacons. Thus only the installed app, and not the Bluetooth beacon transmitter, can track users.

Bluetooth beacon transmitters come in a variety of form factors, including small coin cell devices, USB sticks, and generic Bluetooth 4.0 capable USB dongles.

== History and development ==
The development of the "short-link" radio technology, later named Bluetooth, was initiated in 1989 by Dr. Nils Rydbeck CTO at Ericsson Mobile in Lund and Dr. Johan Ullman. The purpose was to develop wireless headsets, according to two inventions by Johan Ullman, SE 8902098–6, issued 1989-06-12 and SE 9202239, issued 1992-07-24. Since its creation the Bluetooth standard has gone through many generations each adding different features. Bluetooth 1.2 allowed for faster speed up to ≈700 kbit/s. Bluetooth 2.0 improved on this for speeds up to 3 Mbit/s. Bluetooth 2.1 improved device pairing speed and security. Bluetooth 3.0 again improved transfer speed up to 24 Mbit/s. In 2010 Bluetooth 4.0 (Low Energy) was released with its main focus being reduced power consumption. Before Bluetooth 4.0 the majority of connections using Bluetooth were two way, both devices listen and talk to each other. Although this two way communication is still possible with Bluetooth 4.0, one way communication is also possible. This one way communication allows a bluetooth device to transmit information but not listen for it. These one way "beacons" do not require a paired connection like previous Bluetooth devices so they have new useful applications.

== Design ==
=== Battery powered ===
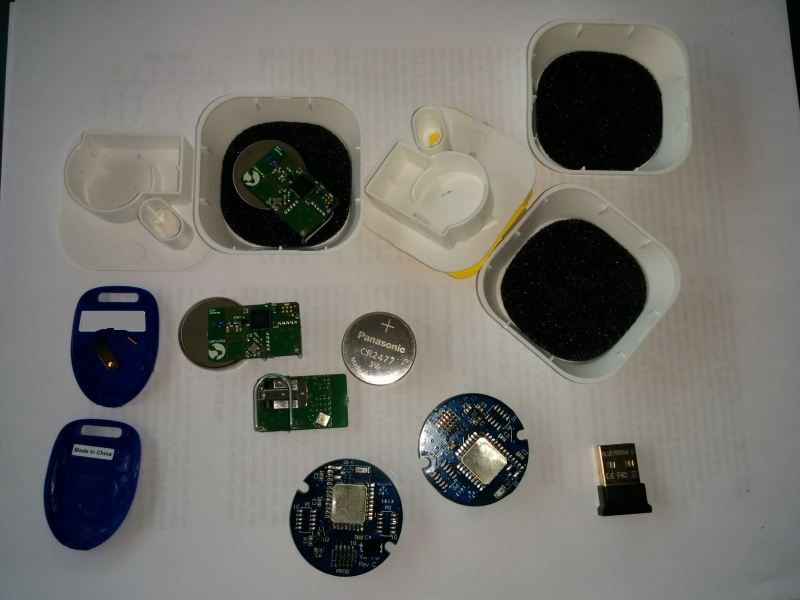
An assortment of iBeacons from different vendors

Bluetooth beacons operate using the more power efficient Bluetooth 4.0 Low Energy standard so battery-powered devices are possible. Battery life of devices varies depending on manufacturer. Several chipsets makers, including Texas Instruments and Nordic Semiconductor now supply chipsets optimized for iBeacon use. Power consumption depends on iBeacon configuration parameters of advertising interval and transmit power. Battery life can range between 1–48 months. Apple's recommended setting of 100 ms advertising interval with a coin cell battery provides for 1–3 months of life, which increases to 2–3 years as advertising interval is increased to 900 ms.

Battery consumption of the phones is a factor that must be taken into account when deploying beacon enabled apps. A recent report has shown that older phones tend to draw more battery power in the vicinity of iBeacons, while the newer phones can be more efficient in the same environment. In addition to the time spent by the phone scanning, number of scans and number of beacons in the vicinity are also significant factors for battery drain.

An energy efficient iBeacon application considers these aspects in order to strike a good balance between app responsiveness and battery life.

=== USB powered ===
Bluetooth beacons can also come in the form of USB dongles. These small USB beacons can be powered by a standard USB port which makes them ideal for long term permanent installations.

== Uses ==
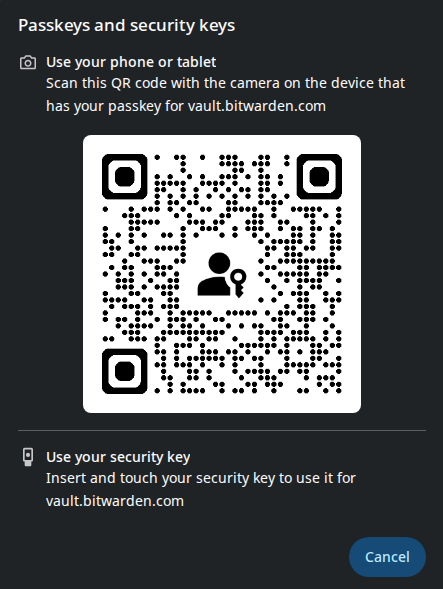
Screenshot of WebAuthn Hybrid Transport with Bluetooth Low Energy (known as cloud-assisted Bluetooth Low Energy, caBLE) on Chromium

=== Advertising ===
Bluetooth beacons can be used to send a packet of information that contains a Universally Unique Identifier (UUID). This UUID is used to trigger events specific to that beacon. In the case of Apple's iBeacon the UUID will be recognized by an app on the user device that will trigger an event. This event is fully customizable by the app developer but in the case of advertising the event might be a push notification with an ad. However, with a UID based system the users device must connect to an online server which is capable of understanding the beacons UUID. Once the UUID is sent to the server the appropriate message action is sent to a users device.

Other methods of advertising are also possible with beacons, URIBeacon and Google's Eddystone allow for a URI transmission mode that unlike iBeacons UID doesn't require an outside server for recognition. The URI beacons transmit a URI which could be a link to a webpage and the user will see that URI directly on their phone.

=== Authentication ===
WebAuthn Hybrid Transport with cloud-assisted Bluetooth Low Energy (caBLE) allowed roaming authenticators such as smartphones to authenticate with WebAuthn credential (known as passkey), Bluetooth Low Energy is used as proximity check between roaming authenticators and client (such as personal computers).

=== Notification and interaction ===
Beacons can be associated with the artpieces in a museum to encourage further interaction. For example, a notification can be sent to user's mobile device when user is in the proximity to a particular artpiece. By sending user the notification, user is alerted with the artpiece in his proximity, and if user indicates their further interest, a specific app can be installed to interact with the encountered artpiece. In general, a native app is needed for a mobile device to interact with the beacon if the beacon uses iBeacon protocol; whereas if Eddystone is employed, user can interact with the artpiece through a physical web URL broadcast by the Eddystone.

=== Indoor navigation ===
Indoor positioning with beacons falls into three categories. Implementations with many beacons per room, implementations with one beacon per room, and implementations with a few beacons per building. Indoor navigation with Bluetooth is still in its infancy but attempts have been made to find a working solution.

==== Many beacons per room ====
With multiple beacons per room trilateration can be used to estimate a users' position to within about 2 meters. Bluetooth beacons are capable of transmitting their Received Signal Strength Indicator (RSSI) value in addition to other data. This RSSI value is calibrated by the manufacturer of the beacon to be the signal strength of the beacon at a known distance, typically one meter. Using the known output signal strength of the beacon and the signal strength observed by the receiving device an approximation can be made about the distance between the beacon and the device. However this approximation is not very reliable, so for more accurate position tracking other methods are preferred. Since its release in 2010 many studies have been connected using Bluetooth beacons for tracking. A few methods have been tested to find the best way of combining the RSSI values for tracking. Neural networks have been proposed as a good way of reducing the error in estimation. A Stigmergic approach has also been tested, this method uses an intensity map to estimate a users location.

Bluetooth LE specification 5.1 added further more precise methods for position determination using multiple beacons. Bluetooth Core Specification 6.0, adopted in September 2024, introduced Channel Sounding, a platform-native ranging feature intended to provide more accurate distance and direction estimates than earlier RSSI-based or angle-of-arrival/angle-of-departure approaches. Subsequent releases have refined this capability: Bluetooth Core 6.2 (November 2025) added amplitude-based attack resilience for Channel Sounding to guard against ranging spoofing.

==== One beacon per room ====
With only one beacon per room, a user can use their known room position in conjunction with a virtual map of all the rooms in a building to navigate a building. A building with many separate rooms may need a different beacon configuration for navigation. With one beacon in each room a user can use an app to know the room they are in, and a simple shortest path algorithm can be used to give them the best route to the room they are looking for. This configuration requires a digital map of the building but attempts have been made to make this map creation easier.

==== Few beacons per building ====
Beacons can be used in conjunction with pedestrian dead reckoning techniques to add checkpoints to a large open space. PDR uses a known last location in conjunction with direction and speed information provided by the user to estimate a person's location. This technique can be used to estimate a person's location as they walk through a building. Using Bluetooth beacons as checkpoints the user's location can be recalculated to reduce error. In this way a few Bluetooth beacons can be used to cover a large area like a mall.

=== Healthcare ===
Using the device tracking capabilities of Bluetooth beacons, in-home patient monitoring is possible. Using bluetooth beacons a person's movements and activities can be tracked in their home. Bluetooth beacons are a good alternative to in house cameras due to their increased level of privacy. Additionally bluetooth beacons can be used in hospitals or other workplaces to ensure workers meet certain standards. For example, a beacon may be placed at a hand sanitizer dispenser in a hospital – the beacons can help ensure employees are using the station regularly.

=== Tracker ===
One use of beacons is as a "key finder" where a beacon is attached to, for example, a keyring and a smartphone app can be used to track the last time the device came in range.

Another similar use is to track pets, objects (e.g. baggage) or people. The precision and range of BLE doesn't match GPS, but beacons are significantly less expensive. Several commercial and free solutions exist, which are based on proximity detection, not precise positioning. For example, Nivea launched the "kid-tracker" campaign in Brazil back in 2014.

== Beacon protocols ==
=== iBeacon ===
In mid-2013, Apple introduced iBeacons and experts wrote about how it is designed to help the retail industry by simplifying payments and enabling on-site offers. On December 6, 2013, Apple activated iBeacons across its 254 US retail stores. McDonald's has used the devices to give special offers to consumers in its fast-food stores. As of May 2014, different hardware iBeacons can be purchased for as little as $5 per device to more than $30 per device. Each of these different iBeacons have varying default settings for their default transmit power and iBeacon advertisement frequency. Some hardware iBeacons advertise at as low as 1 Hz while others can be as fast as 10 Hz.

=== AltBeacon ===
AltBeacon is an open source alternative to iBeacon created by Radius Networks.

=== URIBeacon ===
URIBeacons are different from iBeacons and AltBeacons because rather than broadcasting an identifier, they send an URL which can be understood immediately.

=== Eddystone ===
Eddystone is Google's standard for Bluetooth beacons. It supports three types of packets, Eddystone-UID, Eddystone-URL, and Eddystone-TLM. Eddystone-UID functions in a very similar way to Apple's iBeacon, however, it supports additional telemetry data with Eddystone-TLM. The telemetry information is sent along with the UID data. The beacon information available includes battery voltage, beacon temperature, number of packets sent since last startup, and beacon uptime. Using the Eddystone protocol, Google had built the now discontinued Google Nearby that allowed Android users to receive beacon notifications without an app.

== Comparable technologies ==
Although the near-field communication (NFC) environment is very different and has many non-overlapping applications, it is still compared with iBeacons.

- NFC range is up to 20 cm (7.87 inches) but the optimal range is < 4 cm (1.57 inches). iBeacons have a significantly larger range.
- NFC can be either passive or active. When using passive mode, the power is sent from the reader device. Although Passif (bought by Apple Inc.) has worked on reducing the energy consumption, a battery pack is still needed inside iBeacon tags at this time.
- Most Android smart devices ship with both Bluetooth 4.0 LE and NFC support. On September 19, 2014, also Apple released the iPhone 6 and iPhone 6 plus, supporting the NFC standard, but only limited to payments

== See also ==
- Eddystone
- Facebook Bluetooth Beacon
- Electric beacon
- Pseudolite
- Nearables
- iBeacon
