= AlterGeo =

Russian IT company

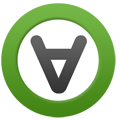
- Type: Private
- Industry: Internet, IT, software, location-based services; location-based advertising, geolocation, hybrid positioning system
- Founded: May 2008; 18 years ago, in Moscow, Russia
- Founder: Anton Baranchuk; Alexandre Dorjiev; Denis Alaev; Sergey Kurlovich
- Headquarters: Moscow, Russia
- Area served: Worldwide
- Key people: Anton Baranchuk (CEO); Alexandre Dorjiev (CTO)
- Number of employees: ~20
- Website: platform.altergeo.ru

AlterGeo, formerly known as Wi2Geo, is a Russian IT company specializing in the development of a global hybrid positioning system which combines Wi-Fi, WiMAX, GSM, GPS, LTE, IP address and network environment approaches. It also created cross-platform location-based services Gvidi and AlterGeo, and hyperlocal banner ad system Local Hero.

According to the Financial Times, AlterGeo is one of four "Russia's next tech titans".(registration required) The company was named winner and finalist of multiple domestic and international awards in the field of technology and media, and currently is a Skolkovo Innovation Center resident. It received funding from several prominent investors, including Intel Capital and Esther Dyson.

== Technology ==
AlterGeo was established in 2008 to build a Wi-Fi positioning technology on the basis of the PhD thesis of one of its founders.

As long as the company's goal was to develop a universal solution which could overcome the limitations of satellite systems such as GPS, A-GPS and GLONASS, the team expanded R&D activities, and developed a "global hybrid system for the positioning of electronic devices by WiFi, WiMAX, GSM, LTE, IP addresses and network environment".

AlterGeo claim their system has significant coverage in Europe, especially in Russia and the CIS, Asia, as well as in North and South America, and claim to operate a database of more than 135 million Wi-Fi, WiMAX, GSM and LTE active access points while processing more than 400 million location requests and positioning more than 100 million devices all over the world on a daily basis. Accuracy: 20–30 metres for the hybrid system; 500–1,000 metres for IP-based positioning.

== B2B function and partnerships ==
AlterGeo's hybrid positioning system allows web and mobile software developers as well as device manufacturers to position their users in order to provide them with location-aware features and collect relevant location-based statistics for marketing issues. The company also developed specific solutions for precise location-based advertising (targeting, retargeting, RTB, etc.) and indoor positioning.

The AlterGeo system can be accessed through API and SDK or deployed on the client side as an on-premises solution. It is used by Badoo, Mail.Ru, 2GIS, LiveJournal and other prominent Internet companies. In 2011, one of Russia's largest advertising networks, Begun, was the first in Russia to launch the location-based contextual advertising service, thanks to cooperation with AlterGeo.

=== Local Hero, hyperlocal ad service ===
In December 2014, AlterGeo released Local Hero, a self-service hyperlocal banner advertising system for local businesses. It claims to be able to publish customers' banners throughout the Internet (via several RTB ad exchanges) and display them on desktop and mobile devices within small geographic areas (the minimum radius is 500 meters).

== B2C location-based services ==
To demonstrate an example of how the alternative positioning system can be implemented in the field of web and mobile services for wide audiences, the company started developing its own B2C location-based services.

=== AlterGeo, geosocial network ===
Launched in 2008, the location-based service of AlterGeo began as a relatively simple friend-to-friend location-sharing service. AlterGeo is currently reported to be the leading cross-platform location-based social network in the whole Russian-speaking world, with more than 1.2 million people using its website and free mobile apps for iOS, Android, Windows Phone (additionally supplied with the augmented reality feature) and Bada.

=== Gvidi, recommendation system ===
According to TechCrunch, in 2012 the company realised "they were sitting on a lot of interesting data which could be applied to restaurants, so they released what they say is an 'intelligent restaurant guide', Gvidi", a free mobile app for iOS and Android based on a sophisticated recommendation system.

Gvidi (from Esperanto: gvidi, IPA: [ˈgvidi], meaning "to guide", "to head", "to lead", "to direct", "to conduct") combines a directory of restaurants, cafes, etc. with the use of social media to try to determine which will be more suitable for the user. The system monitors the user's social graphs through Facebook, Twitter, AlterGeo, Vkontakte, Foursquare etc., as well as their current location, to make recommendations. Restaurants, cafes and bars can be filtered across multiple criteria: Wi-Fi, 24/7, playground, non-smoking, and more. Table booking and special offers are also available.

== International recognition and awards ==
AlterGeo is a winner of TechCrunch's The Europas 2013 and received the Best Russian Startup nomination. The company also won Bully Awards 2012, and was named a finalist of the Red Herring Top 100 Global and Red Herring Top 100 Europe lists.

In 2013, Financial Times listed AlterGeo among four "Russia's next tech titans", together with Yandex, Ozon and Ecwid, whereas Informilo included it in its "Russia's Top 25 Hottest Tech Companies" list one year earlier.

AlterGeo was recognized for the creation of the intelligent mobile restaurant search engine Gvidi. This won the Bully Awards 2013 as a breakthrough technology-based product, the 2nd Apps4All contest as the Best App Using Google Services, and was named the Best Idea project at the international Tactrick Android Developer Cup.

Both brands of AlterGeo and Gvidi were given the highest possible index of AAA in the Russian Startup Rating, and top its IT section.

== See also ==
- Hybrid positioning system
- Wi-Fi positioning system
- Location-based advertising
- Local positioning systems
- Mobile phone tracking
