= Pointr =

Pointr Ltd
- Company type: Private
- Founded: November 2013 in London
- Founders: Ege Akpinar, Axel Katalan, Can Akpinar, Chris Charles
- Headquarters: London
- Website: www.pointr.tech

Pointr is a startup company based in London specialized in indoor positioning and navigation utilising iBeacons, which are Bluetooth Low Energy devices formalised by Apple Inc. Pointr have created a GPS-like experience with true position and turn-by-turn navigation that is supported by most modern smartphones operating on both Android and iOS.

== History ==
Pointr was founded in November 2013 by Ege Akpinar under the name Indoorz; he was then joined by co-founders Axel Katalan, Chris Charles and Can Akpinar in early 2014. The software was developed for seven months before launching, allowing time to build and test the product. In November 2014 the company adopted its current name of Pointr after receiving a client question about whether it could work outdoors as well. Pointr raised its first round of angel funding in January 2015 and has grown steadily with its first customers in retail, warehouses, offices and libraries. In February 2015, Pointr was accepted onto the Microsoft Ventures accelerator program based in Liverpool Street, London. Pointr are also supported by Level 39 (the Fintech Accelerator programme for Canary Wharf Group) and have installed their technology there to locate colleagues and assist new users navigating the venue.
