= Types of beacons =

Beacons are small devices that enable relatively accurate location within a narrow range. Beacons periodically transmit small amounts of data within a range of approximately 70 meters, and are often used for indoor location technology. Compared to devices based on Global Positioning System (GPS), beacons provide more accurate location information and can be used for indoor location. Various types of beacons exist, which can be classified based on their type of Beacon protocol, power source and location technology.

== Types of Beacon protocols ==
=== iBeacon (Apple) ===
In December 2013, Apple announced iBeacon: the first beacon protocol in the market. iBeacon works with Apple's iOS and Google's Android. The beacon using the iBeacon protocol transmits a so-called UUID. The UUID is a string of 24 numbers, which communicate with an installed Mobile App.

Advantages:

1. Widely supported;
2. Simple and easy to implement;
3. Reliable performance on iOS.

=== Eddystone (Google) ===
Google announced Eddystone in July 2015, after it was renamed from its former name UriBeacon. Beacons with support from Eddystone are able to transmit three different frame-types, which work with both iOS and Android. A single beacon can transmit one, two or all three frametypes. The three frametypes are:

Beacon protocol - Google's Eddystone

1. URL: a URL (i.e. a website link) is transmitted to the device, eliminating the need for an installed Mobile App.
2. UID (similar to Apple's UUID): a 16 digit string of characters, which can identify the individual beacon. This UID can activate an installed Mobile App.
3. TLM: sensor and administrative data from the beacon itself is communicated through telemetry. Currently, examples include the beacon's battery level and its temperature.

Advantages:

1. Can also send out URL, which removes the necessity of installed App, and Telemetry information;
2. Open format and flexibility;
3. Integration with Google Products.

=== AltBeacon (Radius Networks) ===
Radius Networks announced AltBeacon in July 2014. This open source beacon protocol was designed to overcome the issue of protocols favouring one vendor over the other.

Advantages:

1. Open source;
2. Compatibility with other mobile operating platforms;
3. More flexibility with a customisable source code.

=== SemBeacon (Vrije Universiteit Brussel) ===
The Web & Information Systems engineering lab (WISE) at the Vrije Universiteit Brussel (VUB) announced SemBeacon in September 2023. It is an open source beacon protocol and ontology based on AltBeacon and Eddystone-URL to create interoperable applications that do not require a local database.

Advantages:

1. Backwards compatible with AltBeacon applications;
2. Does not require a local database to retrieve contextual information;
3. Scalable with additional ontologies;

=== GeoBeacon (Tecno-World) ===
Tecno-World (Pitius Tec S.L., Manufacture-ID 0x015C) announced GeoBeacon in July 2017. This open source beacon protocol was designed for usage in GeoCaching applications due to the very compact type of data storage.

Advantages:

1. Open source;
2. Compatibility with other mobile operating platforms;
3. High resolution coordinates
4. TLM-Data support (Battery life)
5. 8 Bytes of user data

== Types of power source ==
In general, there are three types of power source for beacons:

1. Battery powered: beacons that are battery powered range from using coin cell (or Button cell) batteries, AA, or AAA batteries;
2. Electricity plug powered;
3. USB powered.

== Types of location technology ==
Most beacons use bluetooth technology to communicate with other devices and retrieve the location information. Apart from bluetooth technology however, several other location technologies exist. The most common location technologies are the following:

=== Bluetooth low energy (BLE) ===
The majority of beacon location devices rely on Bluetooth low energy (BLE) technology. Compared to 'classic' Bluetooth technology, BLE consumes less power, has a lower range, and transmits less data. BLE is designed for periodic transfers of very small amounts of data.

=== Wi-Fi Aware ===
In July 2015, the Wi-Fi Alliance announced Wi-Fi Aware. Similar to BLE, Wi-Fi Aware has a lower power consumption than regular Wi-Fi and is designed for indoor location purposes.

=== Combined technologies ===
Whereas most beacon vendors focus on merely one technology, some vendors combine multiple location technologies.

== See also ==
- Beacons
- iBeacon
- Eddystone (Google)
- Proximity marketing
