= IPassMe =

Fintech

iPassMe
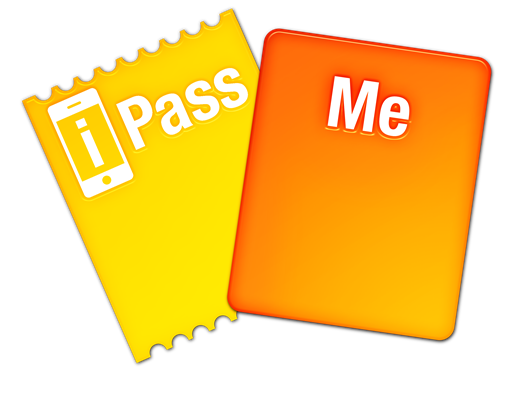
- Company type: startup
- Founded: 31 October 2013
- Headquarters: Como, Italy
- Products: Mobile Wallet API, Passbook (application) Pass Template Designer, Manager and Dispenser, Mobile Wallet Push, IBeacon
- Website: www.ipassme.com

iPassMe is a mobile technology firm based in Italy, using the digital wallet technology to open up a new 1-to-1 dynamic communication channel between businesses and consumers and enhance customer relationship.

== Products ==
iPassMe is a web platform allowing small- and medium-sized enterprises, agencies and developers to create and manage mobile passes (store cards, coupons, event tickets, & more...) with no prior technical knowledge, no upfront investment or complex setup required. iPassMe provides B2B service integrated with Apple Passbook technology and not only, creating new business communication opportunities between customers and retailers, and bridging the gap between consumers and companies who want to innovate by taking advantage of the potential of mobile digital wallet.
iPassMe makes the world of mobile commerce accessible to all businesses with a broad range of software and hardware including iBeacons technology, to provide in-store mobile communication.

== History ==
In 2013, iPassMe was founded by Davide Starnone and Luigi Castiglione. The company received 30k€ in Seed funding in October 2013 from the Italian Incubator ComoNExT.
