= Flitsmeister =

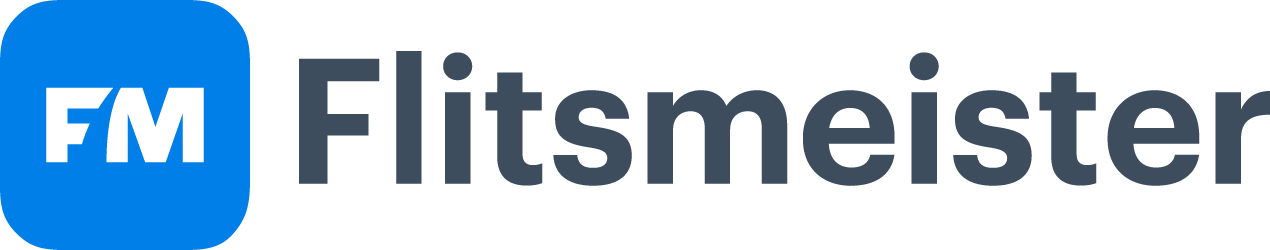
- Original author(s): Sjoerd Perfors and Rick Waalders
- Developer(s): Flitsmeister BV
- Initial release: 14 February 2010; 15 years ago
- Stable release: Android: 13.0 (20 February 2025) iOS: 13.1 (17 February 2025)
- Operating system: Android, iOS, Windows Phone (formerly)
- Website: www.flitsmeister.nl

Flitsmeister is a Dutch mobile app for Android and iOS that warns its users of speed cameras and other traffic obstacles. It has about 1.7 million active users as of May 2020, which the company defines as users who open the app more than twenty times a month on average.

The company is headquartered in Veenendaal, Utrecht.

== Overview ==
The app notifies the user when nearing a speed camera (fixed, mobile, or average speed check) based on the phone's GPS signal. Mobile speed cameras are reported on the app by users, and after passing such a camera the user is asked whether it is still in place. Since its initial release, the notifications have expanded to include warnings about stationary vehicles due to breakdown, ambulances with sirens, traffic jams, road works, bad road surfaces, variable-message signs, and dangerous rail crossings. Information about some of those latter is received from the governmental department Rijkswaterstaat. The app also offers turn-by-turn navigation and the option to pay for parking.

== History ==
Flitsmeister was created by Sjoerd Perfors and Rick Waalders and released in February 2010. At first, the app was exclusively available in Apple's App Store for a few euros. A free Android version was published almost two years later.

At the start of 2012, when Flitsmeister had over 100,000 users, the iOS version of the application became free as well. Jorn de Vries was hired as CCO shortly thereafter. Flitsmeister implemented a revenue model based on location-based advertising, offering a paid version of the app without advertisements (since 2014), and selling floating car data. Besides, Flitsmeister has partnered with a number of radio stations that use mobile speed camera and traffic jam locations in their broadcasts and in turn mention the application. The first channel to use this data was BNR Newsradio, but the list has grown to include Radio 538, Qmusic, and SLAM!.

Flitsmeister reached one million users that opened the app at least once per month in 2016. The look of the app was updated simultaneously. At the end of 2019, the company launched a black device that could be attached to a dashboard called "Flitsmeister One". Using Bluetooth, it automatically starts the Flitsmeister app when driving off and amplifies notifications using a built-in speaker and an LED. It also contains two buttons to give feedback to notifications. Flitsmeister also founded a package delivery platform called "Pickup" in May 2020. Users can receive text messages when a store nearby wants to send a package.
