= Facebook Bluetooth Beacon =

Hardware beacon

The Facebook Bluetooth Beacon is a hardware beacon released by Facebook in 2015. The beacon uses a bluetooth connection to communicate with the Facebook app on the user's smartphone, informing it of the phone's location. The technology allows location-specific advertising to be pushed to the user's Facebook feed.

In June 2015, Facebook gave free beacons to a number of businesses in the United States.

== See also ==
- Bluetooth low energy beacon
- Eddystone
