= Manhattanhenge =

Solar phenomenon in Manhattan, New York City

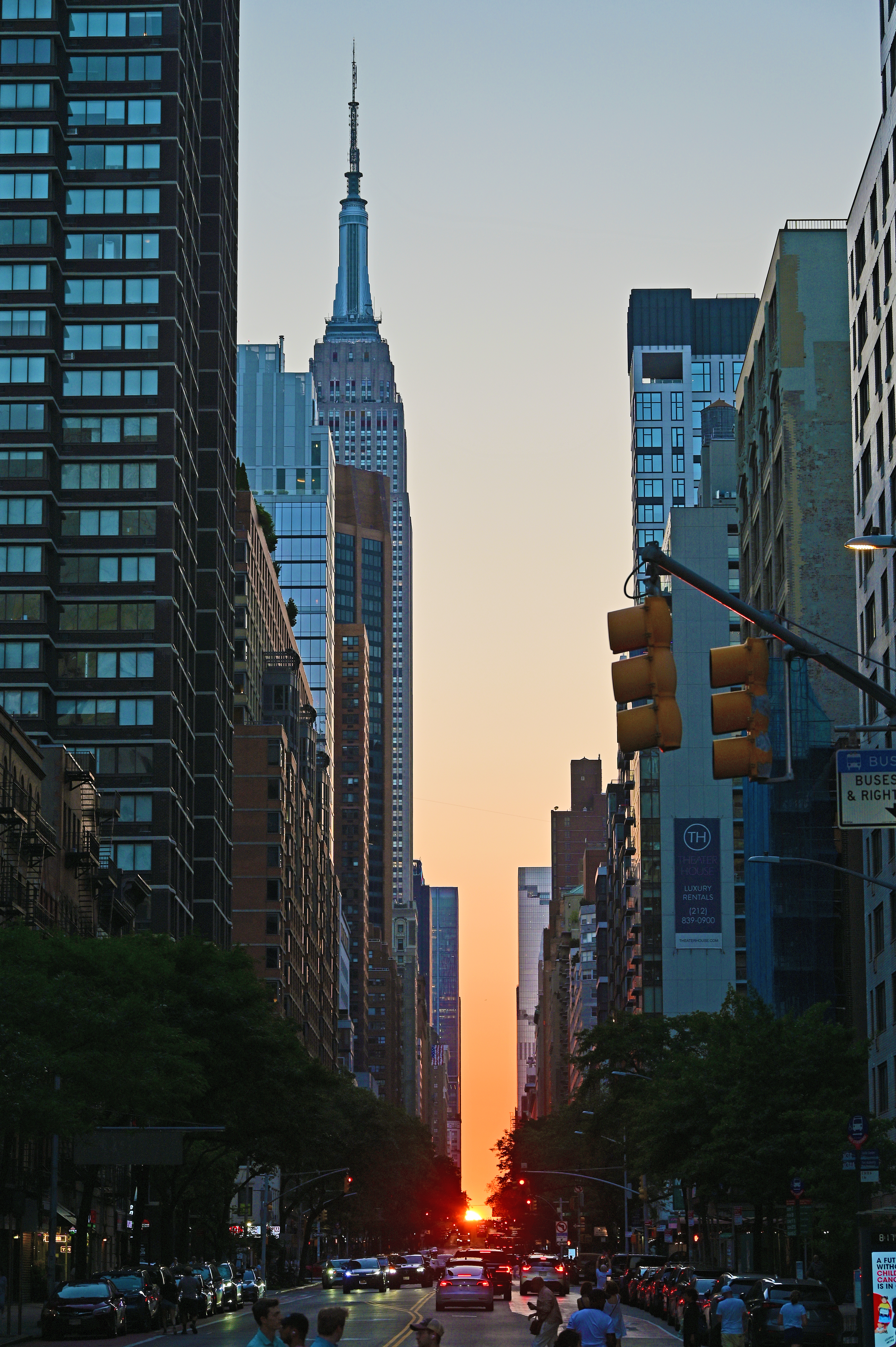
- July 2026 Manhattanhenge on 34th Street
- Genre: Astronomical alignment
- Dates: Around May 28 and July 13
- Frequency: Twice annually
- Locations: Manhattan, New York City
- Country: United States

Manhattanhenge, also called the Manhattan Solstice, is an event during which the setting sun or the rising sun is aligned with the east–west streets of the main street grid of the Manhattan borough of New York City. The astrophysicist Neil deGrasse Tyson claims to have coined the term, by analogy with Stonehenge. The sunsets and sunrises each align twice a year, on dates evenly spaced around the summer solstice and winter solstice. The sunset alignments occur around May 28 and July 13. The sunrise alignments occur around December 5 and January 8.

Manhattan has a phenomenon of this kind due to its extensive urban canyons and its rectilinear street grid that is rotated 29° clockwise from the orthogonal. Many numbered streets align with the view of the Manhattanhenge including 14th, 23rd, 34th, 42nd, and 57th Streets.

== Explanation and details ==
Satellite view of Manhattan centered on the intersection of Park Avenue and 34th Street, showing directions and local times of sunsets (solid arrows) and sunrises (dotted arrows) during Manhattanhenge (black), summer solstice (red), equinoxes (purple), and winter solstice (blue) in 2011. Times marked with an asterisk have been adjusted for daylight saving.

Skaters turn into East 15th St. at Manhattanhenge

The term Manhattanhenge is a reference to Stonehenge, a prehistoric monument located in Wiltshire, England, which was constructed so that the rising sun, seen from the center of the monument at the time of the summer solstice, aligns with the outer "Heel Stone". (Note: The term 'henge' has come to mean a solar alignment with man-made structures, () without regard to the actual meaning of the word; see also the suffix -gate, used by journalists to describe scandals.) The phenomenon (but not the term "Manhattanhenge") was described by Neil deGrasse Tyson, an astrophysicist at the American Museum of Natural History and a native New Yorker in 1997 in the magazine Natural History. In a later interview, Tyson stated that he coined the term, and that it was inspired by a childhood visit to Stonehenge on an expedition headed by Gerald Hawkins, an astronomer who was the first to propose Stonehenge's purpose as an ancient astronomical observatory used to predict movements of sun and stars, as outlined in his 1965 book Stonehenge Decoded. According to Tyson,

I visited Stonehenge as a kid at age 15 on an expedition that [Hawkins] was the expedition head ... and that stuck with me, which is why I named this phenomenon in Manhattan where the sun sets along the street grid ... I named that Manhattanhenge, sort of harkening back to my early days thinking about the alignment of the sun and structures that we might build.

In accordance with the Commissioners' Plan of 1811, the street grid for most of Manhattan is rotated 29° clockwise from true east-west. Thus, when the azimuth for sunset is 299° (i.e., 29° north of due West), the sunset aligns with the streets on that grid. This rectilinear grid design runs from north of Houston Street in Lower Manhattan to south of 155th Street (Manhattan) in Upper Manhattan. A more impressive visual spectacle, and the one commonly referred to as Manhattanhenge, occurs a couple of days after the first such date of the year, and a couple of days before the second date, when a pedestrian looking down the center line of the street westward toward New Jersey can see the full solar disk slightly above the horizon and in between the profiles of the buildings. The date shifts are due to the sunset time being when the last of the sun just disappears below the horizon.

The precise dates of Manhattanhenge depend on the date of the summer solstice, which varies from year to year, but remains close to June 21. In 2014, the "full sun" Manhattanhenge occurred on May 30 at 8:18 p.m., and on July 11 at 8:24 p.m. The event has attracted increasing attention in recent years.

The dates on which sunrise aligns with the streets on the Manhattan grid are evenly spaced around the winter solstice and correspond approximately to December 5 and January 8.

== Occurrences ==
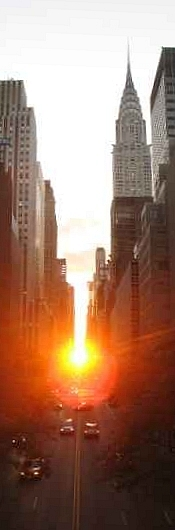
Sunset seen looking west along 42nd Street, 8:23 p.m. on July 13, 2006

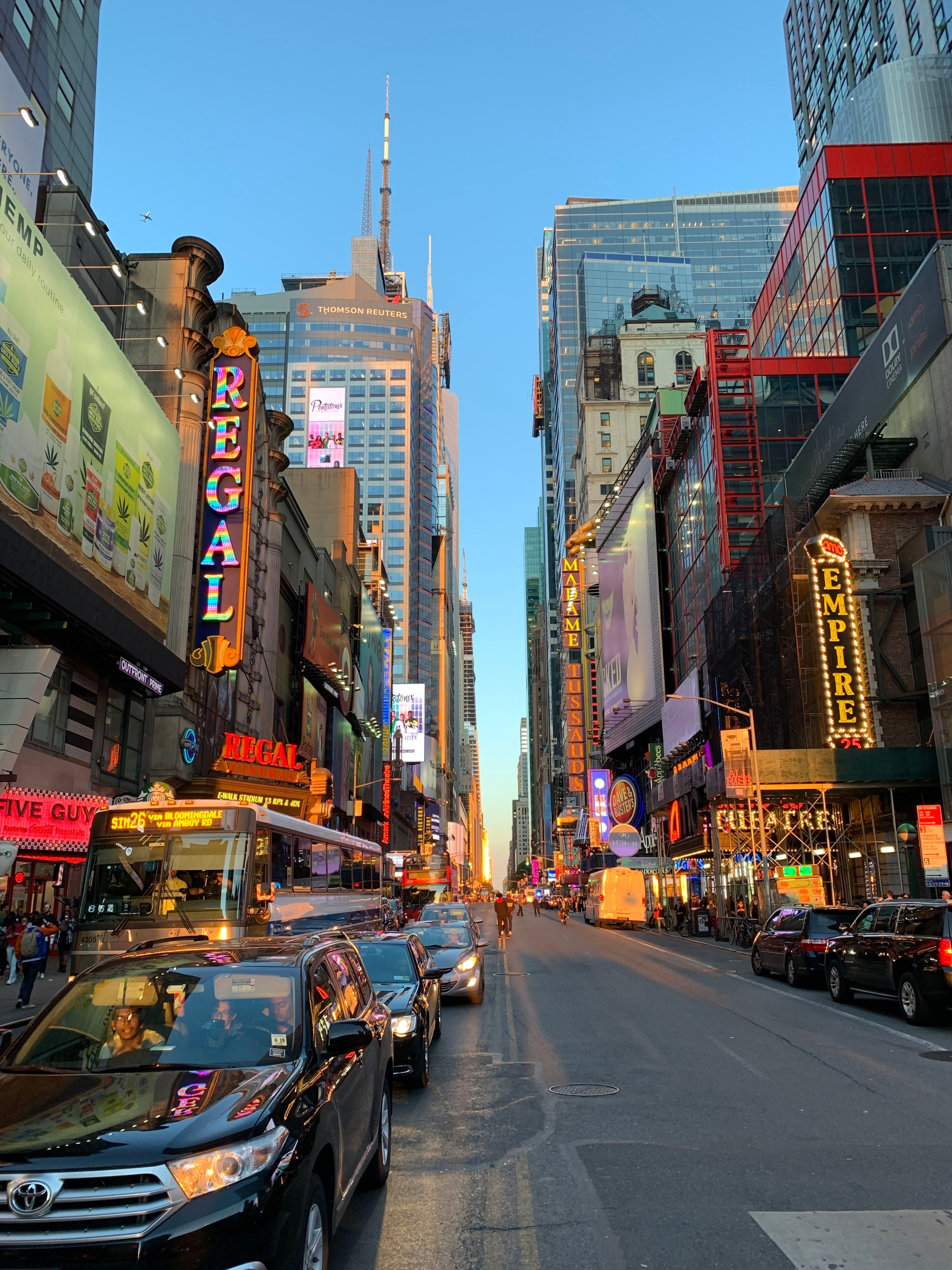
Manhattan sunset on West 42nd Street

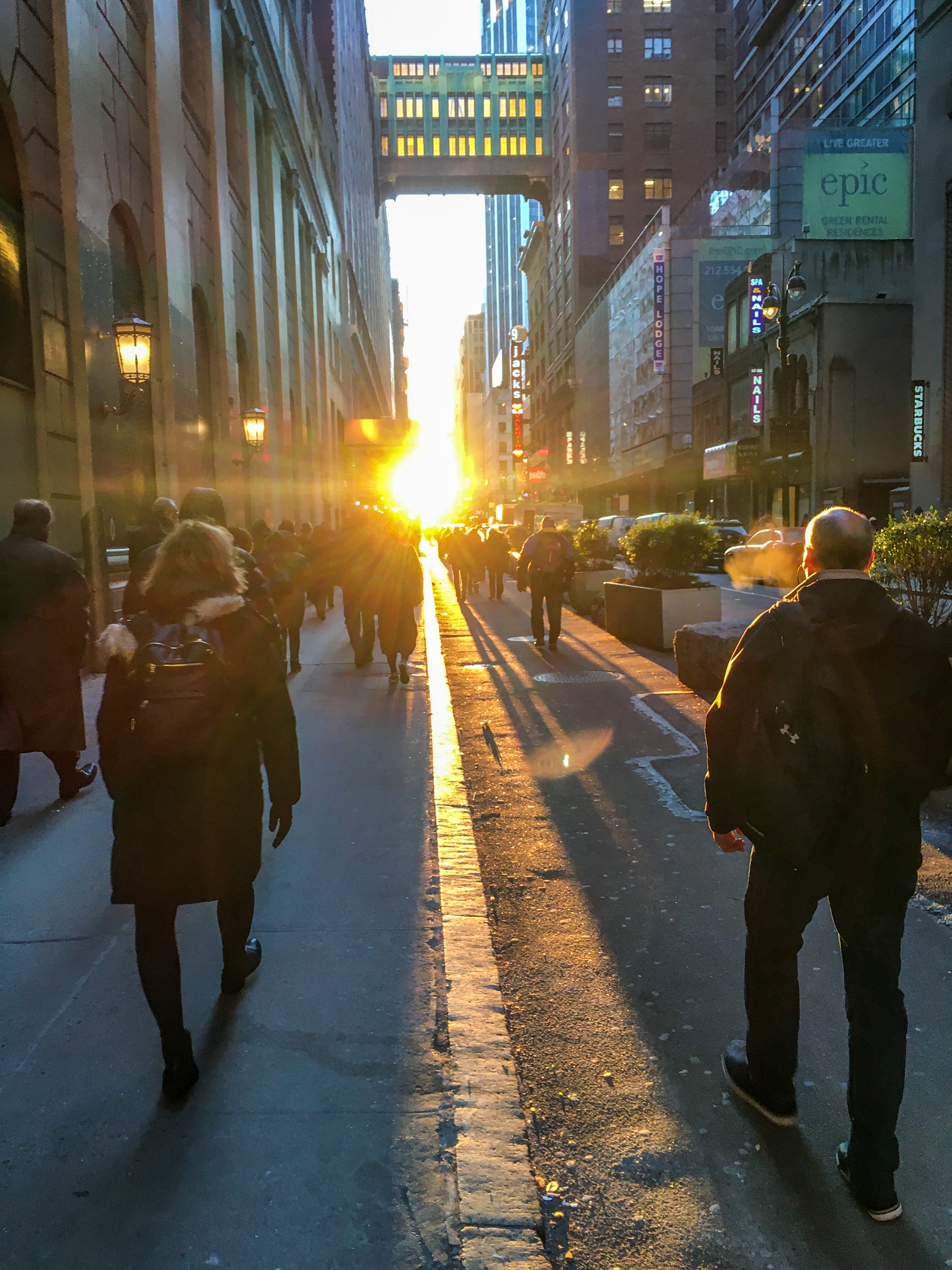
Sunrise along West 32nd St

In the following table, "full sun" refers to occurrences of the full solar disk just above the horizon, while "half sun" refers to occurrences of the solar disk partially hidden below the horizon.

Date	Time	Type
May 29, 2016	8:12 p.m.	Half sun
May 30, 2016	8:12 p.m.	Full sun
July 11, 2016	8:20 p.m.	Full sun
July 12, 2016	8:20 p.m.	Half sun
May 29, 2017	8:13 p.m.	Half sun
May 30, 2017	8:12 p.m.	Full sun
July 12, 2017	8:20 p.m.	Full sun
July 13, 2017	8:21 p.m.	Half sun
May 29, 2018	8:13 p.m.	Half sun
May 30, 2018	8:12 p.m.	Full sun
July 12, 2018	8:20 p.m.	Full sun
July 13, 2018	8:21 p.m.	Half sun
May 29, 2019	8:13 p.m.	Half sun
May 30, 2019	8:12 p.m.	Full sun
July 12, 2019	8:20 p.m.	Full sun
July 13, 2019	8:21 p.m.	Half sun
May 29, 2020	8:13 p.m.	Half sun
May 30, 2020	8:14 p.m.	Full sun
July 11, 2020	8:20 p.m.	Full sun
July 12, 2020	8:21 p.m.	Half sun
May 29, 2021	8:13 p.m.	Half sun
May 30, 2021	8:12 p.m.	Full sun
July 12, 2021	8:20 p.m.	Full sun
July 13, 2021	8:21 p.m.	Half sun
May 29, 2022	8:13 p.m.	Half sun
May 30, 2022	8:12 p.m.	Full sun
July 11, 2022	8:20 p.m.	Full sun
July 12, 2022	8:21 p.m.	Half sun
May 29, 2023	8:13 p.m.	Half sun
May 30, 2023	8:12 p.m.	Full sun
July 12, 2023	8:20 p.m.	Full sun
July 13, 2023	8:21 p.m.	Half sun
May 28, 2024	8:13 p.m.	Half sun
May 29, 2024	8:12 p.m.	Full sun
July 12, 2024	8:21 p.m.	Full sun
July 13, 2024	8:20 p.m.	Half sun
May 28, 2025	8:13 p.m.	Half sun
May 29, 2025	8:12 p.m.	Full sun
July 11, 2025	8:20 p.m.	Full sun
July 12, 2025	8:21 p.m.	Half sun

== Related phenomena in other cities ==
The same phenomenon happens in other cities with a uniform street grid and an unobstructed view of the horizon. If the streets on the grid were rigorously north-south and east–west, then both sunrise and sunset would be aligned on the days of the vernal and autumnal equinoxes (which occur around March 20 and September 23 respectively). In Baltimore, for instance, sunrise aligns on March 25 and September 18 and sunset on March 12 and September 29.

- In Cambridge, Massachusetts, MIThenge occurs about January 29 and November 11, when the setting sun may be seen across the length of the "Infinite Corridor" at the Massachusetts Institute of Technology.
- In Chicago, where the street grid aligns with the cardinal directions, the setting sun lines up with the street canyons near the spring and autumn equinoxes, March 20 and September 25, a phenomenon dubbed Chicagohenge.
- When the architects designing the city centre of Milton Keynes, in the United Kingdom, discovered that its main street almost framed the rising sun on Midsummer Day and the setting sun on Midwinter Day, they consulted Greenwich Observatory to obtain the exact angle required at their latitude, and persuaded their engineers to shift the grid of roads a few degrees.
- In Montevideo, Uruguay, on July 18 sunrise aligns with the 18th of July Avenue, the main avenue of the city which was named after the date of proclamation of Uruguay's First Constitution of 1830. The phenomena was just discovered in 2023.
- In Montreal, there is a Montrealhenge each year around June 12.
- In San Diego, the sunset can be seen underneath the Ellen Browning Scripps Memorial Pier at Scripps Institution of Oceanography twice a year to form Scrippshenge.
- In Paris, "Paris henge" refers to the setting of the sun behind the arches of the Axe historique.
- In San Francisco, the sunrise lines up and falls perfectly above the San Francisco–Bay Bridge between California and Gough Street in San Francisco, twice a year (Spring and Fall). This has been called "California Henge" at times. Also in San Francisco there is a “Crack of light” between two very close buildings on the Summer Solstice at 1698 Sanchez Street every year. Variously over the years there has been a white or yellow line painted on the sidewalk to mark the place where the light shines through the crack on the Solstice.
- In Strasbourg, the Strasbourghenge occurs in October where the rising sun seen from the A351 motorway lines up with the spire of the cathedral.
- In Toronto, the setting sun lines up with the east–west streets on February 16 and October 25, a phenomenon now known locally as Torontohenge.

== See also ==
- Stonehenge replicas and derivatives
