= Locata Corporation =

Locata Corporation is a privately held technology company headquartered in Canberra, Australia, with a fully owned subsidiary in Las Vegas, Nevada. Locata has invented a local positioning system that can either replace or augment Global Positioning System (GPS) signals when they are blocked, jammed or unreliable. Government, commercial and other organizations use Locata to determine accurate positioning as a local backup to GPS.

== History ==
David Small and Nunzio Gambale started work on the initial Locata concepts in 1994 and founded Locata as a company in 1997. As of December 2013, the company has been granted 122 patents around their positioning technology.

== Products ==
=== LocataNet ===
A LocataNet is a ground-based local positioning system that provides positioning information which is indistinguishable from GPS to an appropriately configured receiver. The LocataNet achieves this without the satellites, atomic clocks or ground support structure required by traditional GPS satellite-based systems.

To create a LocataNet, LocataLite radio transceivers are deployed around a defined area. These devices collectively function like a grounded version of a GPS satellite constellation, transmitting radiolocation signals that Locata receivers use to generate a positioning solution, outputting latitude, longitude and altitude, using trilateration in the same way as a traditional GPS receiver. LocataLites can be designed to transmit at any practical frequency or power level. The first commercially deployed designs operate in the same ISM band as Wi-Fi, and each LocataLite generally covers an area of up to 10 kilometers in radius in open environments.

LocataNets provide all of the Position, Navigation and Time (PNT) functions provided by a GPS satellite constellation, but in a local area, such as an open-cut mine, harbor, military range or other area. This allows operators to set up controlled positioning networks to locate, automate and direct objects with centimeter-level accuracy. Locata's duplication of PNT is made possible by the company's patented nanosecond-accurate TimeLoc synchronization technology.

== VRay ==
The VRay is an 80-element spherical antenna that provides precise positioning in dense urban environments and indoors where traditional GNSS receivers are susceptible to large multipath errors. By switching on each element for just over one microsecond, the VRay correlator design in a Locata receiver creates virtual beams which mitigate multipath effects by focusing on the direct received signal and filtering out multipath bounces. Because the VRay can sweep many beams simultaneously around an area it also determines the angle and strength of received signals and this information is used to derive the precise 3D attitude of the receiver platform as well.

In a partnership with the U.S. Air Force Institute of Technology (AFIT), the VRay is being developed for use with GPS receivers as part of a Co-operative Research and Development Agreement (CRADA) signed in April 2013. AFIT will design and test several GPS-based variants of Locata-patented antenna and correlator technology to develop the VRay for military GPS use cases.

== Partners ==
Hexagon, provider of design, measurement and visualization technologies, is the first company to integrate Locata's terrestrial technology within their Leica Geosystems subsidiary's GPS-GLONASS-Galileo-BeiDou receivers.

== Deployments ==
=== Military ===
Locata has been awarded a multi-year sole-source contract with the United States Air Force 746th Test Squadron (746 TS), to deploy a LocataNet and provide positioning information when GPS is jammed across a 2,500 square mile area of the White Sands Missile Range in New Mexico. TMC Design, a certified Locata Technology Integrator (LTI) has been let the contract to design, integrate, install and test Locata's Non-GPS Based Positioning System (NGBPS) at the White Sands Missile Range location.

Before the contract was granted, the USAF proved through independent testing that the LocataNet delivers accuracy of eight inches or less to aircraft up to 35 miles away. Locata's NGBPS system will provide the 746 TS with enhanced validation capabilities in GPS denied environments while operating mobile and airborne position, navigation and timing (PNT) equipment and navigation warfare (NAVWAR) systems.

Locata is the core component for the USAF's Ultra High Accuracy Reference System (UHARS) which will be deployed at White Sands in 2014 to improve performance of military systems in GPS-denied environments. UHARS is described by the USAF as the new "gold standard truth system for the increasingly demanding test and evaluation of future navigation and navigation warfare systems for the U.S. Department of Defense".

=== Mining ===
In partnership with Leica Geosystems, the first commercial LocataNet is deployed at Newmont's Boddington Gold Mine (BGM) in Western Australia. In this environment, Locata's technology provides positioning for automation of mining machines as the pit gets deeper and traditional satellite-based GPS coverage becomes unreliable because fewer satellites are in view in the pit, particularly near the mine's pit walls.

=== Automotive ===
The Insurance Institute for Highway Safety (IIHS), in partnership with Perrone Robotics, in December 2013 completed the installation of phase 1 of a two-stage Locata network as the first portion of a $30 million upgrade to the Vehicle Research Center (VRC). Locata is the sole-source of positioning information for the precision robotics control required by the VRC for the U.S. testing of next-generation vehicle collision avoidance systems. As part of the upgrade, VRC researchers are installing new robotic and high-precision positioning technology for both their outdoor track and 300-by-700 foot indoor testing area.

== See also ==
- Local positioning system
- Pseudolite
