= Johan Ullman =

Swedish medical doctor, scientist and inventor

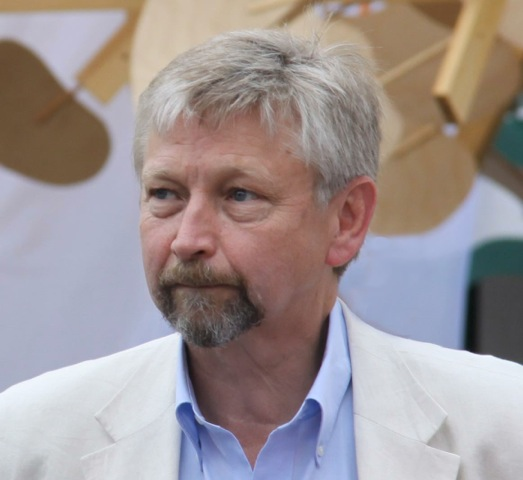
- Born: March 14, 1953 (age 73)
- Occupation: Physician

Johan Ullman is a Swedish medical doctor, scientist, and inventor.

Ullman was born on March 14, 1953, in Hallstavik, Sweden, to civil engineer Uddo Ullman, and Barbro Stenkulla. He grew up in Falun, and received his medical degree from the University of Gothenburg, and his specialist degree in anaesthesia and intensive care at the Linköping University Hospital. Ullman has developed a number of inventions, first and foremost related to ergonomics, injury prevention, medical technology, work environment and IT.

In 1996, at Sahlgrenska University Hospital, Ullman developed a method for measuring exposure to human whole-body impact on board high-speed boats. Today, the method is used internationally. This project was however cancelled as it "risked to result in commercial outputs", since some new technologies that Ullman had developed were shown to reduce shock exposure. US Navy - SOCOM and NAVSEA invited Ullman to continue his research in the US.

Johan Ullman is, in 2013 responsible for ergonomics (human factors), and injury prevention at HSBO Pro, a group of experts in design and acquisition of high speed boats, which also stages the HSBO Forum, a biannual international networking event for professionals in the high-speed work boat community.

== Inventions ==
Inventions within IT and telecom:

- Handsfree / headset for mobile phones, both wireless and wired. This wireless headset, developed at the Ericsson Mobile lab in Lund, Sweden, gave birth to the Bluetooth technology according to two patents.
- "Keylock-function" for mobile phones and "Delay-function", where you have to press and hold the on/off key for one second in order to activate. This is today a standard feature on most mobile phones and computers world-wide. Both features were created to prevent unintentional activation.
- Polyphonic ringtones was initially developed to enable elderly with impaired hearing to hear different frequencies.

Other inventions and ideas:

- Ullman Chair (UllmanStolen), office chairs which allow variation of sitting position among those spontaneously chosen as most comfortable.
- Ullman Keyboard, a split keyboard for computers, was displayed in the permanent exhibition at Design Museum in London for more than 10 years.
- Ullman Steering system, a steering bar steering system, which improves manoeuvrability and control of high speed boats. Since late 90s this steering system is the standard in both the Swedish Coast Guard's and the Swedish Sea Rescue Institution's 8-9m boats.
- Ullman Boat Seats, suspension seats specially developed for high speed boats, and based on Ullman's scientific work. Ullman Seats are exported to more than 65 countries and is standard in the Swedish Coast Guard, Swedish Sea Rescue Society as well as in most NATO countries.
- Evacuation system for anaesthetic gas.
- Moisture Exchanger with cough valve for spontaneously breathing patients.
- Snowboard gloves
- Skiing gloves
- Ullman Mouse, was developed to solve the mouse arm problem. This invention utilises fine-motoric muscles and movement patterns, just like when using a normal pen. This reduces the static load on exposed muscle groups. The invention was first published in 2002 by Ullman Technology AB. In 2003, the company was seized by a Venture Capital firm, Gylling Invest AB, which changed the company name to Penclic AB. The product was renamed Penclic Mouse.

The capture of the company, and the invention has been featured on Swedish national TV, Uppdrag Granskning (Mission Scrutiny) and other media. The case has also been subject to debates in the Swedish Parliament, as well as in academic reports.
