= Nearables =

Internet of things objects

Nearables (also nearable technology) is a term for a type of smart object, invented by Estimote Inc. The term is used to describe everyday items that have small, wireless computing devices attached to them. These devices can be equipped with a variety of sensors and work as transmitters to broadcast digital data through a variety of methods, but they usually use the Bluetooth Smart protocol. These objects provide mobile devices within their range with information about their location, state, and immediate surroundings. The word 'nearables' is a reference to wearable technology – electronic devices worn as part of clothing or jewelry.

The term 'nearables' was first introduced by Estimote Inc. in 2014 as part of a marketing campaign associated with a product launch of the next generation of Bluetooth Smart beacons. Using the language of Estimote, 'nearables' were an implementation of the iBeacon standard that provided orientation, temperature, and motion information – enabling functionality for Internet of Things applications.

== History ==
Nearables are a further development of the Internet of Things (also referred to as Internet of Everything). This is a vision of a wide, global network of interconnected devices, using the existing Internet infrastructure to provide services beyond standard machine-to-machine communications. Although the term Internet of Things was coined by Kevin Ashton in 1999, the idea can be traced to the late 1980s, when Mark Weiser introduced the idea of ubiquitous computing.

Location-based services emerged in the 1990s with widespread adoption of mobile phones and development of location- and proximity-based technologies, such as GPS and RFID. This, in turn, led to first attempts at wireless proximity marketing in 2000s with early versions of Bluetooth, NFC and Wi-Fi standards as predominant technologies. However, it was not until 2013, when Apple Inc. announced the iBeacon protocol for Bluetooth Smart-enabled devices, that the idea of creating smart objects by attaching wireless beacons to them started gaining traction.

In August 2014 Estimote Inc. launched Estimote Stickers, a new generation of small Bluetooth Smart-based beacons. The term ‘nearables’ was inspired by the wearable computers gaining increasing popularity in 2013 and 2014. Two such computers were the Pebble smartwatch and Google Glass. Originally, nearables were described as smart, connected objects that broadcast data about their location, motion and temperature.

== Technology ==
In its first interpretation, Nearables are not devices themselves. Any object (or a live being, like a human or animal) can become a nearable after a wireless, electronic sensor is attached to it and starts broadcasting data to nearby mobile devices. Due to the continued miniaturization of sensor technology, a single transmitter could be equipped with a whole set of these, for example: accelerometer, thermometer, ambient light sensor, humidity sensor or magnetometer. In the second interpretation the actual nearable devices can be part of an infinite array of smart interconnected objects, programmed to improve an individual's vicinity in every way, usually to be used in a smart home environment. Making today's homes smart by having nearable technologies creating these devices to act intuitively depending on the needs of individuals through self learning software.

First examples of nearables were objects tagged with Bluetooth Smart beacons supporting accelerometer and temperature sensor and broadcasting their signal in the range of approximately 50 meters. They can communicate with mobile applications installed on devices with Bluetooth 4.0, compatible with Bluetooth Smart protocol on the software side. At the moment of their launch, it included mainly iOS 7 and high-end Android mobile devices.

== Use cases ==
To create a nearable, one must attach an electronic device, working as both a sensor and a transmitter, to an object. Since the only limitation is the size of the device, both items and living beings can act as nearables. The most often cited examples, however, include retail and home automation environments.

== See also ==
- Internet of Things
- Machine to Machine
- Bluetooth
