= Urban canyon =

Street lined by very tall buildings on both sides, typically in large cities

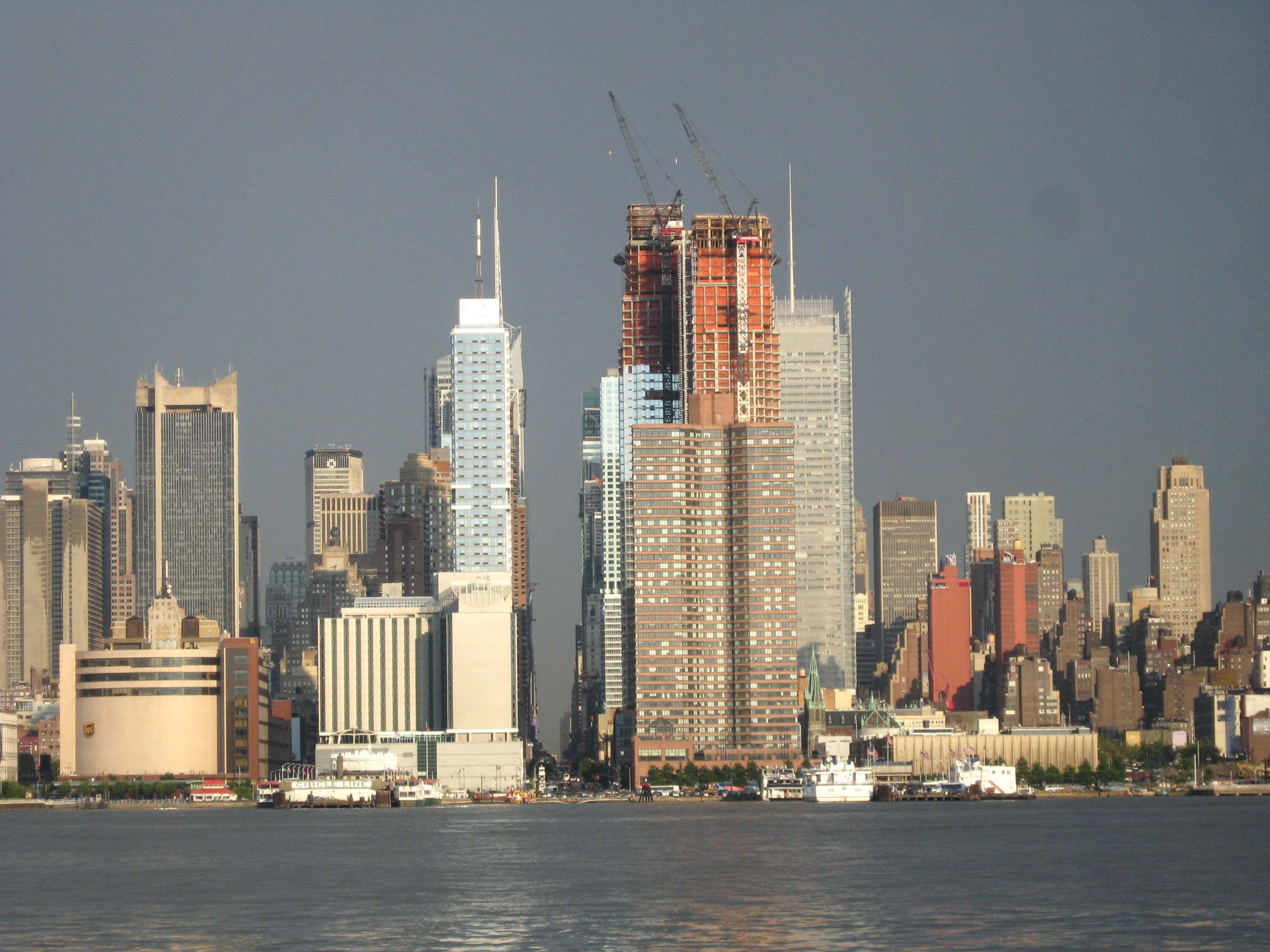
An urban canyon at 42nd Street, Midtown Manhattan, New York City

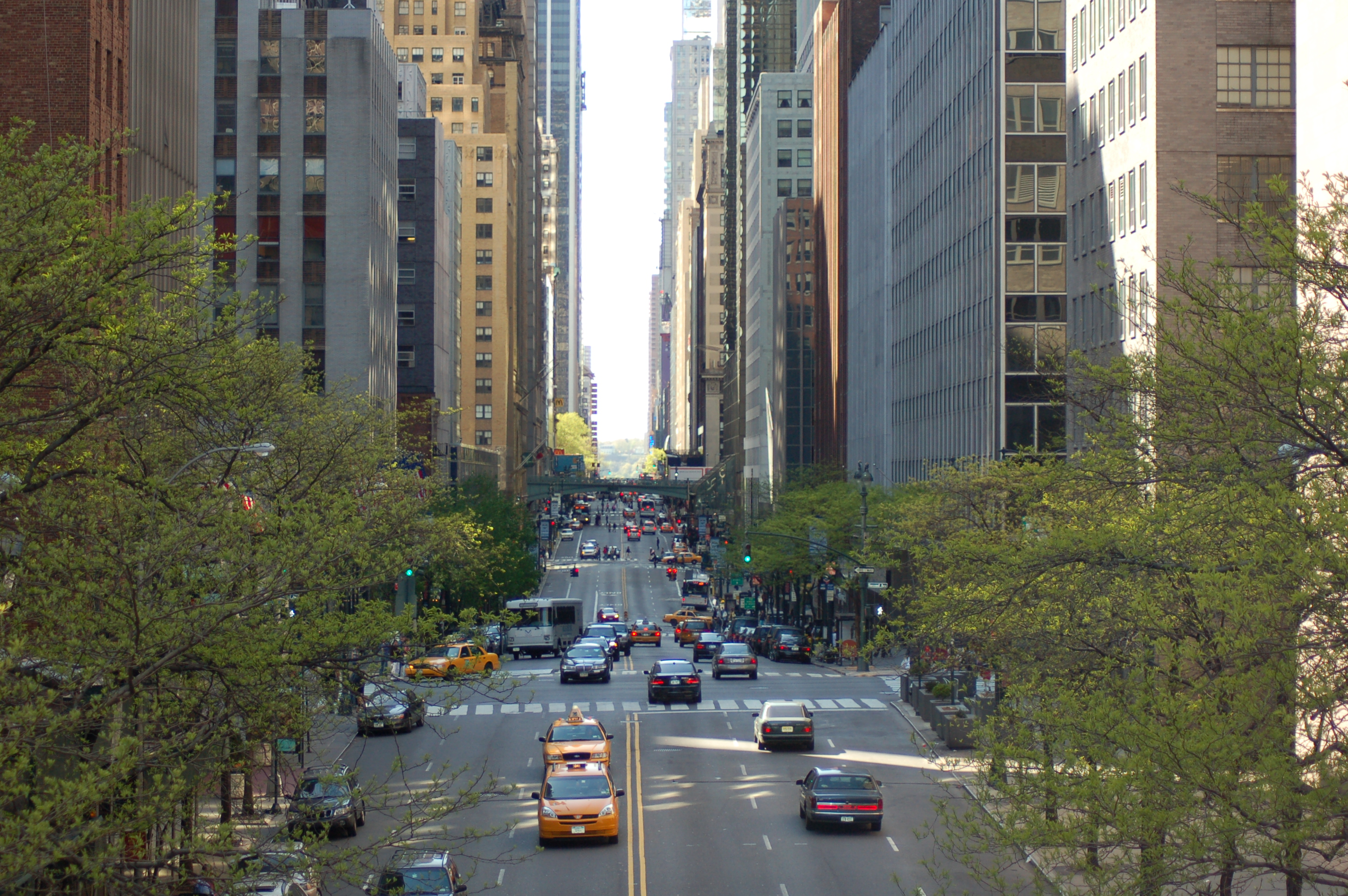
The same Manhattan street seen from within, with many buildings much taller than the width of the road

An urban canyon (also known as a street canyon or skyscraper canyon) is a place where the street is flanked by buildings on both sides creating a canyon-like environment, evolved etymologically from the Canyon of Heroes in Manhattan. Such human-built canyons are made when streets separate dense blocks of structures, especially skyscrapers. Other examples include the Magnificent Mile in Chicago, Los Angeles' Wilshire Boulevard corridor, Toronto's Financial District, and Hong Kong's Kowloon and Central districts.

Urban canyons affect various local conditions, including temperature, wind, light, air quality, and radio reception, including satellite navigation signals.

== Geometry and classification ==
Ideally an urban canyon is a relatively narrow street with tall, continuous buildings on both sides of the road. But now the term urban canyon is used more broadly, and the geometrical details of the street canyon are used to categorize them. The most important geometrical detail about a street canyon is the ratio of the canyon height (H) to canyon width (W), H/W, which is defined as the aspect ratio. The value of the aspect ratio can be used to classify street canyons as follows:

- Regular canyon – aspect ratio ≈ 1 and no major openings on the canyon walls
- Avenue canyon – aspect ratio < 0.5
- Deep canyon – aspect ratio ≈ 2

A sub-classification of each of the above can be done depending on the distance between two major intersections along the street, defined as the length (L) of the street canyon:

- Short canyon – L/H ≈ 3
- Medium canyon – L/H ≈ 5
- Long canyon – L/H ≈ 7

Another classification is based on the symmetry of the canyon:

- Symmetric (or even) canyon – the buildings that make the canyon have approximately the same height;
- Asymmetric canyon – the buildings that make the canyon have significant height differences.

Another specific type is:

- Step-up canyon – a street canyon where the height of the upwind building is less than the height of the downwind building.

The effect of a street canyon on local wind and air quality can greatly differ in different canyon geometries and this will be discussed in detail in sections below.

Other important factors taken into account in studies of urban canyons are the air volume, orientation of the canyon (north–south, east–west etc.) and the sky view factor. The air volume of the street canyon is the air contained within the buildings on either side which act as walls, the street which is the bottom boundary, and an imaginary upper boundary at roof level called the 'lid' of the canyon.

The sky view factor (SVF) denotes the ratio between radiation received by a planar surface and that from the entire hemispheric radiating environment and is calculated as the fraction of sky visible from the ground up. SVF is a dimensionless value that ranges from 0 to 1. A SVF of 1 means that the sky is completely visible, for example, in a flat terrain. When a location has buildings and trees, it will cause the SVF to decrease proportionally.

== Effects ==
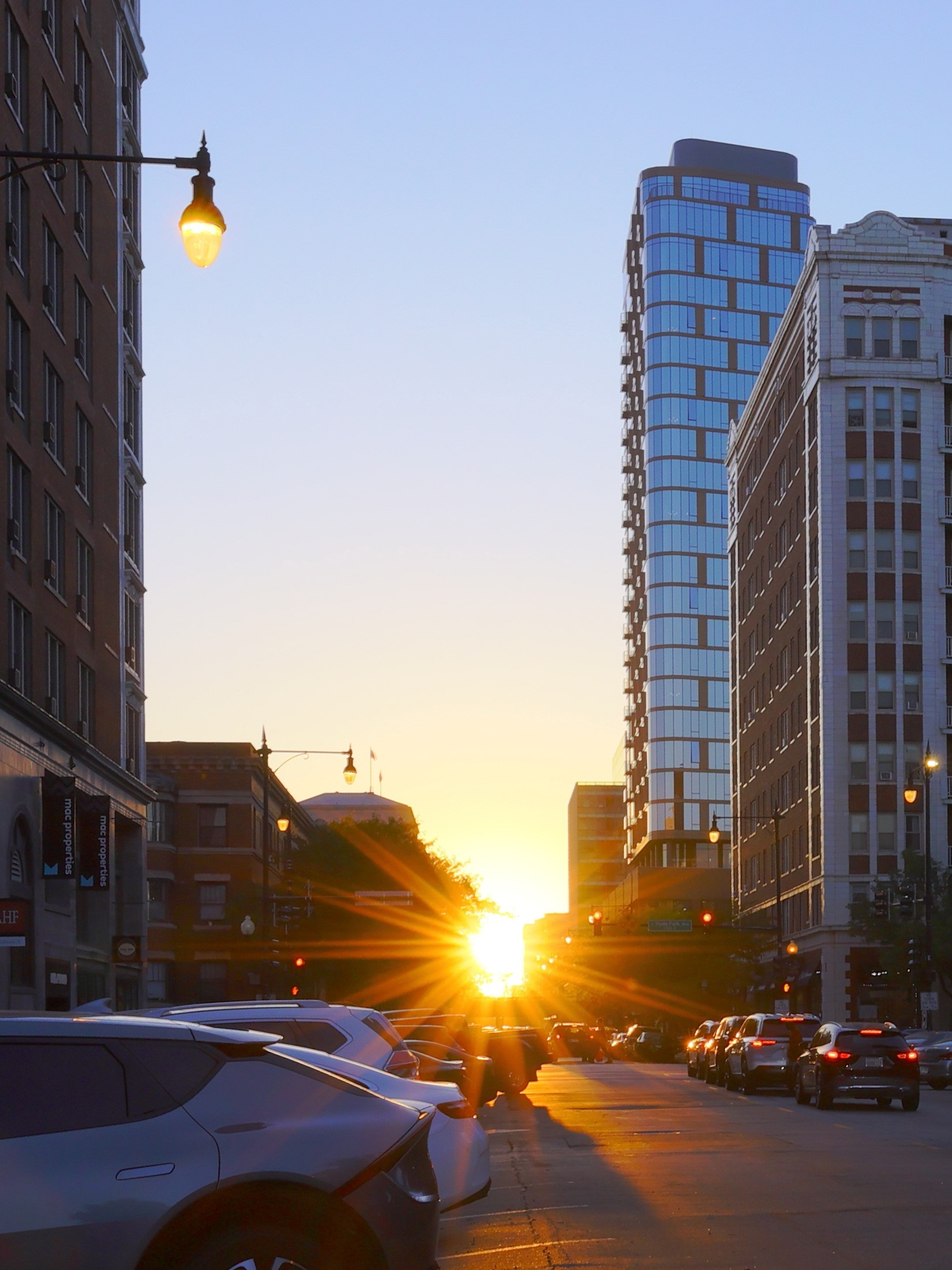
Near the equinoxes, sunrises and sunsets align with east-west urban street canyons, an event known as Chicagohenge (pictured). In other cities, similar phenomena with names such as Manhattanhenge occur at various times of the year.

The modification of the characteristics of the atmospheric boundary layer by the presence of a street canyon is called the street canyon effect. As mentioned earlier, street canyons affect temperature, wind speed and wind direction and consequently the air quality within the canyon.

=== Temperature ===
Urban canyons contribute to the urban heat island effect. The temperature inside the canyon can be elevated 2–4 °C. Studies of temperature phenomena consider irradiance, angle of incidence, surface albedo, emissivity, temperature and SVF. For a high SVF, the urban canyons cool quickly, because more sky is available to absorb the heat retained by the buildings. With a low SVF, the canyon can retain more heat during the day, creating a higher heat release at night. A study done by Nunez and Oke investigated the energy exchanges in an urban canyon in mid-latitudes in fine summer weather. The study showed that the amount of surface energy at various times within the canyon depends on canyon geometry and orientation. Canyons with north–south orientation were found to have the floor being the most active energy site. In such a canyon, 30% of midday radiant surplus is stored in the canyon materials (the buildings). At night, the net radiant deficit (meaning the lack of solar radiation) is countered by the release of energy that was being stored in the canyon materials. This phenomenon contributes heavily to the urban heat island effect.

=== Wind ===
Street canyons can modify both the speed and the direction of winds. The vertical wind velocity approaches zero at the roof level of the canyon. Shear production and dissipation are high at the roof level and a strong thin shear layer is created at the building height. Turbulence kinetic energy is higher near the downwind building than near the upwind building because of stronger wind shears. The resulting flow patterns inside the canyon depend on the wind direction with respect to the street orientation direction.

==== Wind parallel to canyon ====
When the roof level/background wind direction is parallel to the street, a channelization effect is seen where winds tend to be channeled and accelerated through the canyon. Where the street width is non-uniform, a Venturi effect is seen when winds funnel through small openings, further enhancing the acceleration of winds. Both these effects are explained by the Bernoulli's principle. The along-street wind and transport can be significantly different for short and long canyons as the corner vortices have a stronger influence in short canyons.

==== Wind perpendicular to canyon ====
When the roof level/background wind direction is perpendicular to the street, a vertically rotating wind flow is created with a centered primary vortex inside street canyons. Based on the aspect ratio, different flow regimes are defined in street canyons. In the increasing order of aspect ratio these flow regimes are: isolated roughness flow, wake interference flow and skimming flow. The total number of vortices made and their intensities depends on many factors. Numerical model studies done for isolated street canyons have shown that the number of vortexes made increases with increasing aspect ratio of the canyon. But there is a critical value of the ambient wind speed, above which the number and pattern of vortexes become independent of the aspect ratio.

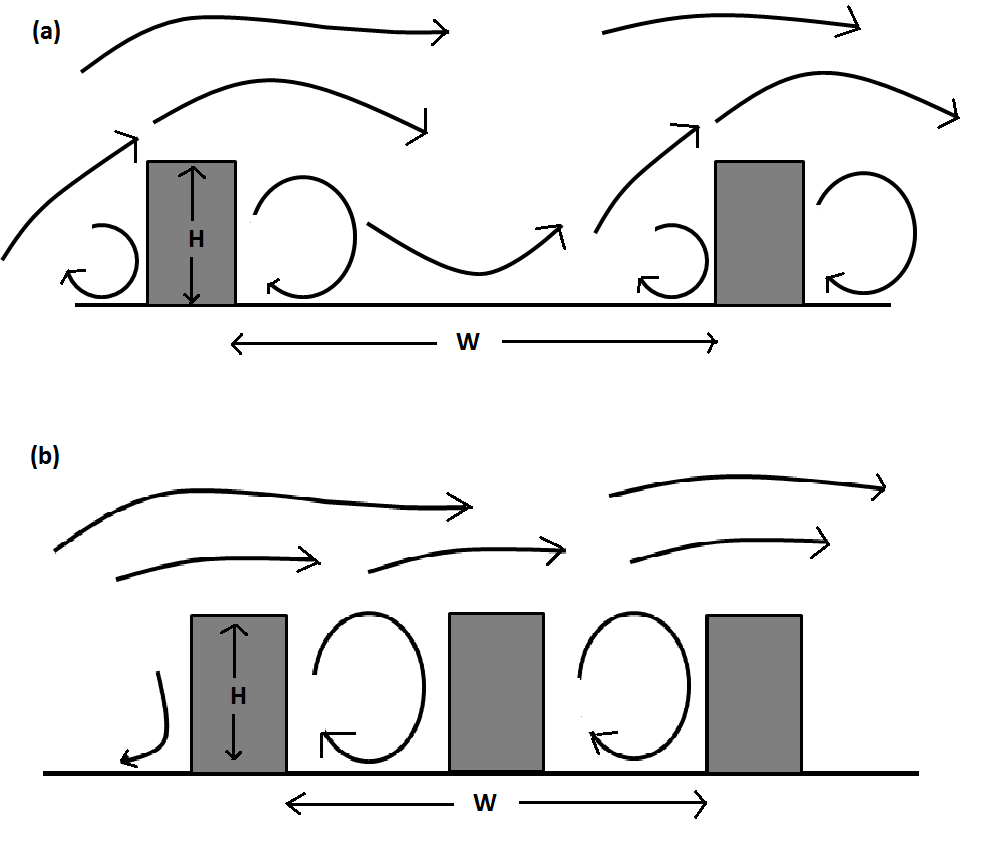
The comparison of (a) isolated roughness flow and (b) skimming flow regimes in a street canyon (after Oke, 1988)

Numerical and wind tunnel studies have shown that for symmetric canyons with an aspect ratio = 0.5, a ground level secondary vortex can be seen near the leeward side building wall. For symmetric canyons with aspect ratio ≥ 1.4, a weaker ground level secondary vortex can be seen near the windward side building wall and for aspect ratio ≥ 2 secondary vortexes are seen right below the primary vortex. In asymmetric and step-up canyons the formation of secondary vortexes can be more common. Wind tunnel studies have shown that, in a step-up canyon where the upwind building is shorter, a stagnation point can be identified on the windward face of the taller building. The region below this stagnation point is called the interaction region, since all streamlines in this region are deflected downward into the street canyon. The characteristics of the vortex flow patterns inside the canyon strongly depend the height ratio of buildings on either side of the canyon. For a downwind building height H_{d} to upwind building height H_{u} ratio of 3, a single primary vortex has been observed. But for H_{d}/H_{u}=1.67, counter-rotating vortexes can occupy the whole depth of the canyon.

Other factors that have an effect on the strength of this re-circulation flow are traffic induced turbulence and roof shapes of the buildings. Physical model studies have shown that two way traffics increases the turbulence in the lower half of the canyon and that pitched roof on either side of the canyon shifts the main area of turbulent production downstream and reduced the intensity of the re-circulation flow inside the canyon.

In the skimming flow regime, the wind vortex made inside a street canyon, when mean wind direction is perpendicular to the street (after Oke, 1988)

Under these perpendicular wind conditions, mainly at the street level, at each end of the canyon, horizontally rotating corner/end vortexes are made. The horizontal extent of these corner vortexes are different at each end of a canyon and this leads complex surface level wind patterns at intersections. Field experiments have further shown that corner vortexes can extend in the whole depth of canyon but with changing horizontal extent with height.

The structure of the neighboring area of a street canyon; for instance a series of street canyons, add more complexity to flow field.

All the above-mentioned results are for situations with no heating effects. A numerical model study have shown that, when a surface in a street canyons heats up, it changes the characteristics of the vortex flow. And heating of different surfaces; upwind wall, downwind wall, canyon floor, changes the vortex flow in different manners.

=== Air quality ===
The modification of temperature and wind by the presence of a street canyon, consequently affect the air quality inside the street canyon. When the direction of the mean wind is parallel to the street, the channelization and Venturi effects described above, increases the dispersion of pollutants inside the street canyon. This often act to 'flush out' the air pollutants and increase the air quality inside the street canyon. But in instances where air pollutant sources are present upwind, channeling winds could transport pollutants to downwind locations far from the source and contribute to bad quality at the downwind locations.

When the mean wind direction is perpendicular to the street, the vortex flow formed inside the canyon acts to confine air flow, reduce dispersion of pollutants and increase the pollution concentrations inside the street canyon. Pollution from local source inside the canyon and also pollution entrained in to the canyon from the mean wind flow, is carried by the vortex flow and is re-circulated within the canyon. In urban environments, vehicle tail pipe emissions are the major source of many air pollutants such as ultrafine particles, fine particles, carbon dioxide, NOx. These pollution plumes created on the street, at the surface level, are pushed toward the lee side of the canyon by the vortex flow, making the surface level pollution concentrations much higher at the leewardside of the street compared to the windward side. Secondary vortexes in the lower portion of the canyon can further act to stagnate pollutants on the side walks; specially on the leeward side. One field study has reported ultrafine particle concentrations four times higher on the leeward side sidewalk compared to the windward side.

=== GNSS signal reception ===
When using GNSS receivers in street canyons with tall buildings, the shadowing and multipath effects may contribute to poor signal reception.

== See also ==
- Manhattanhenge
- Manhattanization
- Setback
- Wind engineering
