= Magnetic positioning =

Magnetic positioning is an IPS (Indoor positioning system) solution that takes advantage of the magnetic field anomalies typical of indoor settings by using them as distinctive place recognition signatures. The first citation of positioning based on magnetic anomaly can be traced back to military applications in 1970. The use of magnetic field anomalies for indoor positioning was first claimed in 1999, with later publications related to robotics in the early 2000s.

Most recent applications can employ magnetic sensor data from a smartphone used to wirelessly locate objects or people inside a building.

According to Opus Research magnetic positioning will emerge as a “foundational” indoor location technology.

== Companies ==
=== GiPStech ===
Independent research brought in 2011 a team of researchers to focus on anomalies to the geomagnetic field as a possible naturally available field to be used for localization of consumer electronic devices.

After some years of research and tests they were able to implement an indoor localization platform that, based on the fingerprinting of a building geomagnetic field and of advanced sensor fusion, was able to precisely locate a device and its user without any infrastructure. Moreover, the platform was also able to compensate most of known issues of local magnetic field variability.

In 2014 the team founded GiPStech - as academic spin-off of Università della Calabria - to complete the R&D and commercialize the platform.

=== Indoor Atlas ===
Professor Janne Haverinen and Anssi Kemppainen worked also on the magnetic approach. Noticing that buildings' magnetic distortions were leading machines astray, they eventually turned the problem around and focused attention on the magnetic interferences caused by steel structures. What they found was that the disturbances inside them were consistent, creating a magnetic fingerprint unique to a building.

Professor Janne Haverinen founded the company IndoorAtlas in 2012 to commercialize the magnetic positioning solution with dual headquarters in Mountain View, CA and Oulu, Finland.

== Issues ==
The local magnetic field is affected by moving metal objects like lifts or metal cabinets.
