= Pseudolite =

Terrestrial GPS transceiver

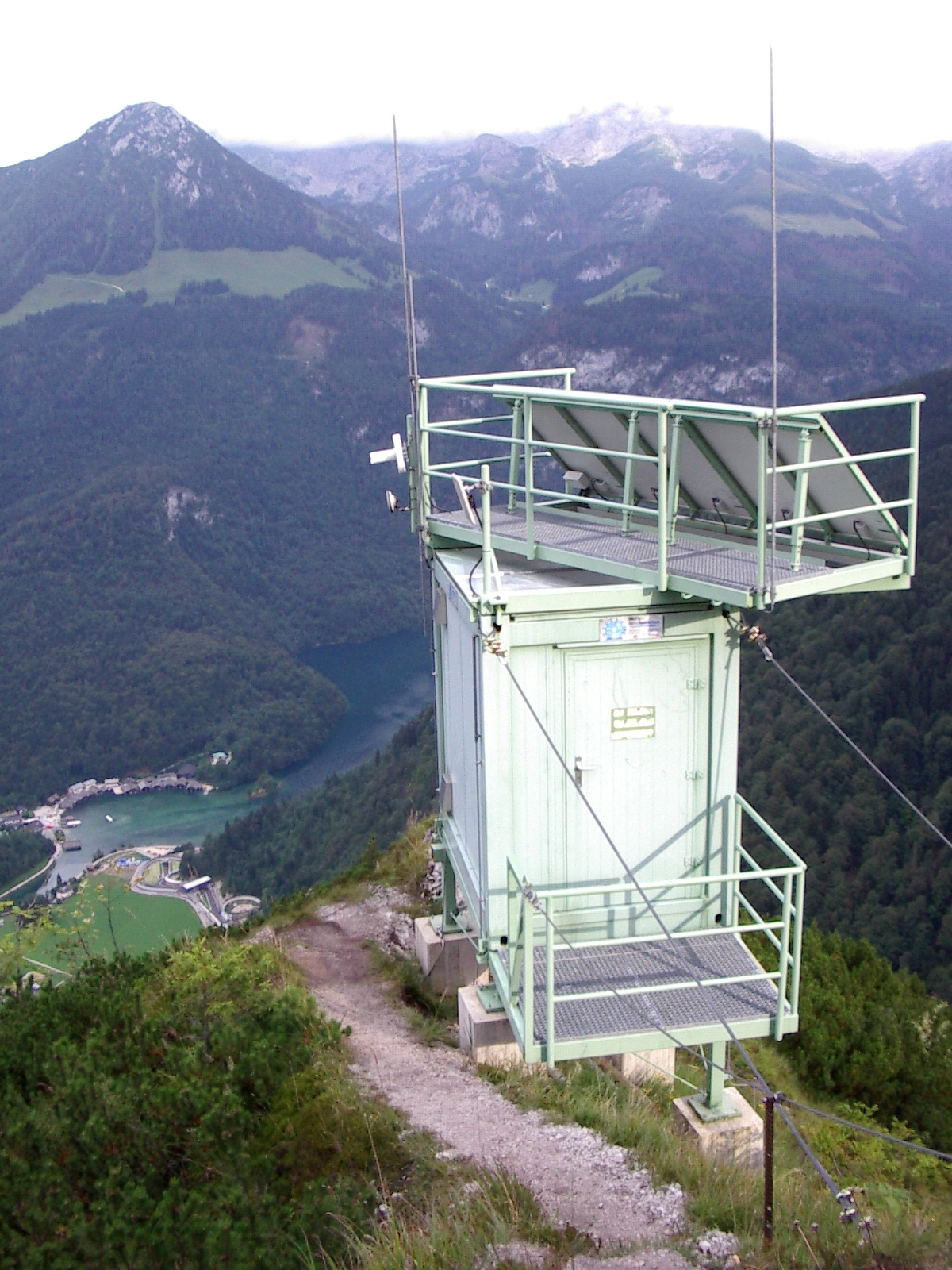
A Galileo test environment Pseudolite in the Berchtesgaden Alps

Pseudolite is a contraction of the term "pseudo-satellite," used to refer to something that is not a satellite which performs a function commonly in the domain of satellites. Pseudolites are most often small transceivers that are used to create a local, ground-based Global Positioning System (GPS) alternative. The range of each transceiver's signal is dependent on the power available to the unit.

Being able to deploy one's own positioning system, independent of the GPS, can be useful in situations where the normal GPS signals are either blocked/jammed (military conflicts), or simply not available (exploration of other planets). Pseudolites are normally used to augment the GPS by improving dilution of precision (DOP). Or pseudolites are also used to implement GPS-like indoor location systems, where pseudolites are acting as GPS satellites. Pseudolites use cheap voltage controlled oscillator, so pseudolite based location system shall provide a methodology to compensate clock differences among pseudolites.

For planetary exploration, research being conducted at facilities including NASA's Ames Research Center and Stanford University (see link at bottom) may allow a rover to deploy an array of pseudolites with no particular accuracy and still calibrate the system to centimeter-level resolution without human assistance. This would aid a rover's path-finding routines and increase the safe maneuvering speed of the unassisted vehicle. The concept is sometimes referred to as a Self-Calibrating Pseudolite Array (SCPA).

Other applications of pseudolite arrays include precision approach landing systems for aircraft and highly accurate tracking of transponders.

Pseudolites have started to gain more and more attention in the context of indoor location.

== See also ==
- Local positioning system
- Locata Corporation
