= Location-based advertising =

Location-based advertising (LBA) is a form of advertising that integrates mobile advertising with location-based services. The technology is used to pinpoint consumers location and provide location-specific advertisements on their mobile devices.

According to Bruner and Kumar, "LBA refers to marketer-controlled information specially tailored for the place where users access an advertising medium".

== Types ==
There are two types of location-based services in general: push and pull.

The push approach is more versatile and is divided into two types. A not requested service (opt-out) is the more common approach amongst the two approaches, as this allows advertisers to target users until the users do not want the ads to be sent to them. By contrast, through using the opt-in approach the users can determine what type of advertisements or promotional material they can receive from the advertisers. The advertisers must abide by certain legal regulations set in place and respect users' choices.

In contrast, using the LBA pull approach, users can directly search for information by entering certain keywords. The users look for specific information and not the other way around. For example, a traveler visiting New York could use a local search application such as WHERE on her device to find the nearest local Chinese restaurant in Manhattan. After she selects one of the restaurants, a map is provided as well as an offer of a free appetizer good for the next hour.

Location-based advertising is closely related to mobile advertising, which is divided into four types:

- Messaging
- Display
- Search
- Product placement

== Process ==
For push-based LBA, users must opt-into the company's LBA program; this would most likely be done via the seller's website or at the store. Then users would be requested to provide their personal information, such as mobile phone number, first name, and other related information. After the data are all submitted, the company would send a text message requesting users to confirm the LBA subscription. Once these steps have been completed, the company can now use location-based technology to provide their customers with geographically based offers and incentives.

For pull-based LBA, users interact with local, typically mobile, sites or applications, and are presented offers in a standard pull advertising model. Location-based advertising companies like go2 Media aggregate local listings from yellow page companies, local directories, group discount businesses and others. Users are presented these ads as display advertising integrated with publisher content or search advertising in response to user queries.

In addition to directly opting in, users may see location-based display ads served from a location-based ad aggregator/network such as NAVTEQ or AdLocal by Cirius Technologies.

== Potential benefits ==
LBA, as a form of direct marketing, allows marketers to reach specific target audiences. Bruner and Kumar state that LBA enhances the ability to reach people in a much more targeted manner than was possible in the past. For example, if a customer has purchased a Harry Potter movie from a DVD/CD rental store and subscribed to the store's LBA program, he can expect to receive a message on his mobile phone about the release date of the next Harry Potter movie, including a movie sample, while he is on the train going back home.

Since LBA can improve advertising relevance by giving the customer control over what, when, where, and how they receive ads, it provides them with more relevant information, personalized message, and targeted offer. Vidaille (2007) stated, “With a targeted message, we’ve reached about 20 percent response rate. That’s incredibly good”. The internet can do similar things, such as sending new information about products, promotional coupons, or asking consumers' opinion, but few people respond to e-mail marketing because it’s not personal anymore. In contrast, LBA gives consumers relevant information rather than spam; therefore, it increases the chances of getting higher responses.

Finally, unlike other traditional media, LBA, in addition to being used as advertising, can also be used to research consumers which can be used to tailor future offers. “Consumers are constantly providing information on their behavior through mobile internet activity”. With location-based service, surveys can take place in the real world, in real time, rather than in halls, in a focus group facility, or on a PC. Mobile survey can be integrated with a marketing campaign; the results of customer satisfaction research can be used iteratively to guide the next campaign. For example, a restaurant that is experiencing increased competition can use the specific database – a collection of small mobile surveys of customers who had used coupons from the LBA in the geographic area – to determine their dining preferences, times, and occasions. Marketers can also use customers' past consumption patterns to forecast future patterns and send special dining offers to the target population at the right place and time, in order to build interest, response, and interaction to the restaurant.

== Concerns ==
=== Privacy issues ===
The mobile phone is an incredibly personal tool. However, as Darling pointed out, “The fact that mobile device is so personal can be both a strength and a weakness”. On one hand, marketers can entertain, inform, build brand awareness, create loyalty, and drive purchase decision among their target consumers through LBA. On the other hand, consumer privacy is still a concern. Therefore, the establishment of a well thought-out consumer privacy and preference management policy is critical to the long-term success of LBA. Marketers should inform their consumers on how their information is to be stored, secured, and used or combined with other purposes of marketing. If LBA can assist people in their everyday life, they will be more than happy to reveal their location. To conclude, in order to ensure continue success and long-term longevity of LBA, consumer trust must be established and maintained. LBA needs to be permission-based and marketers must take great strides in protecting customers' privacy and respecting their preferences. In International Journal of Mobile Marketing, Banerjee and Dholakia found that the response to LBA depends not only on the type of location but also the kind of activity the individual is engaged in. They are more likely to prefer LBA in public places and during leisure time.

=== Perception of spam ===
Another major concern for LBA is spam; consumers can easily perceive LBA as spam if it is done inappropriately. According to Fuller, spam is defined as “any unsolicited marketing message sent via electronic mail or to a mobile phone”. In short, spam is an unwanted message that is delivered even though a user has not requested for it. Since the customer is in control and all activities are voluntary, customers' objective, goals, and emotions must be taken into account. A recent survey showed that users spend only 8 to 10 seconds on mobile advertisements. Therefore, the interaction must be straightforward and simple. Marketers must also develop relevant and engaging advertising content that mobile users want to access at the right place and time. More importantly, marketers must make sure that their offer contains real value for the customer, and must follow strict opt-in policies. The best way for marketers to distance from spam is to give consumers choice, control, and confidentiality while insuring that they only received relevant information.

=== Potential breaches of advertising standards ===
Misuse of LBA can result in claims for a product or service that the advertiser cannot substantiate. Advertisements and advertorials that incorporate the geographical location of the customer have the potential to breach advertising rules, standards and codes of conduct in many legislatures. For instance, the UK Advertising Standards Authority (ASA) requires all advertisements to be honest, truthful and not mislead. Since the promoter will not know the final wording of the advertisement in every case, it cannot undergo a proper compliance check. A claim such as "[location] woman loses 10 pounds with our new diet plan" is clearly false, since it cannot be substantiated for the majority of geographies where the advertisement might appear. Claims based on LBA have been ruled misleading by the ASA on a case-by-case basis.

== See also ==
- Geomarketing
