= Indoor positioning system =

Network of devices used to wirelessly locate objects inside a building

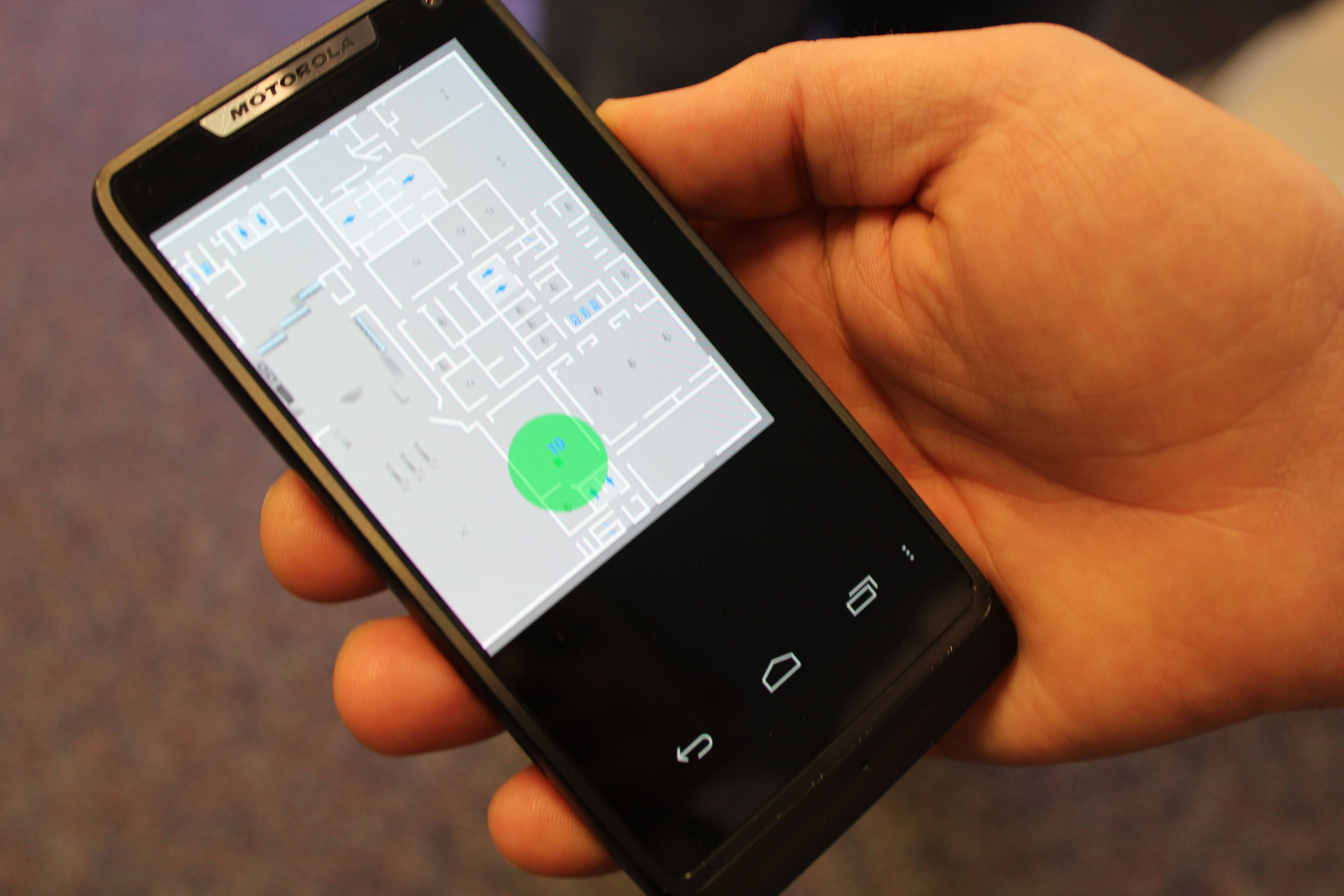
An indoor location tracking map on a mobile phone

An indoor positioning system (IPS) is a network of devices used to locate people or objects where GPS and other satellite technologies lack precision or fail entirely, such as inside multistory buildings, airports, alleys, parking garages, and underground locations.

A large variety of techniques and devices are used to provide indoor positioning ranging from reconfigured devices already deployed such as smartphones, Wi-Fi and Bluetooth antennas, digital cameras, and clocks; to purpose built installations with relays and beacons strategically placed throughout a defined space. Lights, radio waves, magnetic fields, acoustic signals, and behavioral analytics are all used in IPS networks. IPS can achieve position accuracy of 2 cm, which is on par with RTK enabled GNSS receivers that can achieve 2 cm accuracy outdoors. IPS use different technologies, including distance measurement to nearby anchor nodes (nodes with known fixed positions, e.g. Wi-Fi / Li-Fi access points, Bluetooth beacons or Ultra-Wideband beacons), magnetic positioning, dead reckoning. They either actively locate mobile devices and tags or provide ambient location or environmental context for devices to get sensed. The localized nature of an IPS has resulted in design fragmentation, with systems making use of various optical, radio, or even acoustic technologies.

IPS has broad applications in commercial, military, retail, and inventory tracking industries. There are several commercial systems on the market, but no standards for an IPS system. Instead each installation is tailored to spatial dimensions, building materials, accuracy needs, and budget constraints.

For smoothing to compensate for stochastic (unpredictable) errors there must be a sound method for reducing the error budget significantly. The system might include information from other systems to cope for physical ambiguity and to enable error compensation. Detecting the device's orientation (often referred to as the compass direction in order to disambiguate it from smartphone vertical orientation) can be achieved either by detecting landmarks inside images taken in real time, or by using trilateration with beacons. There also exist technologies for detecting magnetometric information inside buildings or locations with steel structures or in iron ore mines.

== Applicability and precision ==
Due to the signal attenuation caused by construction materials, the satellite based Global Positioning System (GPS) loses significant power indoors affecting the required coverage for receivers by at least four satellites. In addition, the multiple reflections at surfaces cause multi-path propagation serving for uncontrollable errors. These very same effects are degrading all known solutions for indoor locating which uses electromagnetic waves from indoor transmitters to indoor receivers. A bundle of physical and mathematical methods is applied to compensate for these problems. Promising direction radio frequency positioning error correction opened by the use of alternative sources of navigational information, such as inertial measurement unit (IMU), monocular camera Simultaneous localization and mapping (SLAM) and Wi-Fi SLAM. Integration of data from various navigation systems with different physical principles can increase the accuracy and robustness of the overall solution.

Indoor Positioning Systems are highly effective in environments where GPS signals are weak or unavailable, such as hospitals, malls, warehouses, factories, airports, and underground facilities. The achievable accuracy depends on the technology used. Wi-Fi and Bluetooth-based systems typically provide accuracy between 1–5 meters, making them suitable for navigation and asset tracking, while advanced technologies like UWB (Ultra-Wideband) can achieve centimeter-level precision for high-accuracy applications such as robotics, industrial automation, and real-time equipment tracking. However, factors like wall materials, signal interference, multipath reflections, and moving objects can impact performance and reduce positioning accuracy.

The U.S. Global Positioning System (GPS) and other similar global navigation satellite systems (GNSS) are generally not suitable to establish indoor locations, since microwaves will be attenuated and scattered by roofs, walls and other objects. However, in order to make the positioning signals become ubiquitous, integration between GPS and indoor positioning can be made.

Currently, GNSS receivers are becoming more and more sensitive due to increasing microchip processing power. High sensitivity GNSS receivers are able to receive satellite signals in most indoor environments and attempts to determine the 3D position indoors have been successful. Besides increasing the sensitivity of the receivers, the technique of A-GPS is used, where the almanac and other information are transferred through a mobile phone.

However, despite the fact that proper coverage for the required four satellites to locate a receiver is not achieved with all current designs (2008–11) for indoor operations, GPS emulation has been deployed successfully in Stockholm metro. GPS coverage extension solutions have been able to provide zone-based positioning indoors, accessible with standard GPS chipsets like the ones used in smartphones.

== Types of usage ==
=== Locating and positioning ===
While most current IPS are able to detect the location of an object, they are so coarse that they cannot be used to detect the orientation or direction of an object.

=== Locating and tracking ===
One of the methods to thrive for sufficient operational suitability is "tracking". Whether a sequence of locations determined form a trajectory from the first to the most actual location. Statistical methods then serve for smoothing the locations determined in a track resembling the physical capabilities of the object to move. This smoothing must be applied, when a target moves and also for a resident target, to compensate erratic measures. Otherwise the single resident location or even the followed trajectory would compose of an itinerant sequence of jumps.

=== Identification and segregation ===
In most applications the population of targets is larger than just one. Hence the IPS must serve a proper specific identification for each observed target and must be capable to segregate and separate the targets individually within the group. An IPS must be able to identify the entities being tracked, despite the "non-interesting" neighbors. Depending on the design, either a sensor network must know from which tag it has received information, or a locating device must be able to identify the targets directly.

== Wireless technologies ==
Any wireless technology can be used for locating. Many different systems take advantage of existing wireless infrastructure for indoor positioning. There are three primary system topology options for hardware and software configuration, network-based, terminal-based, and terminal-assisted. Positioning accuracy can be increased at the expense of wireless infrastructure equipment and installations.

=== Wi-Fi-based positioning system (WPS) ===
Wi-Fi positioning system (WPS) is used where GPS is inadequate. The localization technique used for positioning with wireless access points is based on measuring the intensity of the received signal (received signal strength in English RSS) and the method of "fingerprinting". To increase the accuracy of fingerprinting methods, statistical post-processing techniques (like Gaussian process theory) can be applied, to transform discrete set of "fingerprints" to a continuous distribution of RSSI of each access point over entire location. Typical parameters useful to geolocate the Wi-Fi hotspot or wireless access point include the SSID and the MAC address of the access point. The accuracy depends on the number of positions that have been entered into the database. The possible signal fluctuations that may occur can increase errors and inaccuracies in the path of the user.

=== Bluetooth ===
Originally, Bluetooth was concerned about proximity, not about exact location. Bluetooth was not intended to offer a pinned location like GPS, however is known as a geo-fence or micro-fence solution which makes it an indoor proximity solution, not an indoor positioning solution.

Micromapping and indoor mapping has been linked to Bluetooth and to the Bluetooth LE based iBeacon promoted by Apple Inc. Large-scale indoor positioning system based on iBeacons has been implemented and applied in practice.

Bluetooth speaker position and home networks can be used for broad reference.

In 2021 Apple released their AirTags which allow a combination of Bluetooth and UWB technology to track Apple devices amongst the Find My network causing a surge of popularity for tracking technology.

=== Choke point concepts ===
Simple concept of location indexing and presence reporting for tagged objects, uses known sensor identification only. This is usually the case with passive radio-frequency identification (RFID) / NFC systems, which do not report the signal strengths and various distances of single tags or of a bulk of tags and do not renew any before known location coordinates of the sensor or current location of any tags. Operability of such approaches requires some narrow passage to prevent from passing by out of range.

=== Grid concepts ===
Instead of long range measurement, a dense network of low-range receivers may be arranged, e.g. in a grid pattern for economy, throughout the space being observed. Due to the low range, a tagged entity will be identified by only a few close, networked receivers. An identified tag must be within range of the identifying reader, allowing a rough approximation of the tag location. Advanced systems combine visual coverage with a camera grid with the wireless coverage for the rough location.

=== Long range sensor concepts ===
Most systems use a continuous physical measurement (such as angle and distance or distance only) along with the identification data in one combined signal. Reach by these sensors mostly covers an entire floor, or an aisle or just a single room. Short reach solutions get applied with multiple sensors and overlapping reach.

=== Angle of arrival ===
Angle of arrival (AoA) is the angle from which a signal arrives at a receiver. AoA is usually determined by measuring the time difference of arrival (TDOA) between multiple antennas in a sensor array. In other receivers, it is determined by an array of highly directional sensors—the angle can be determined by which sensor received the signal. AoA is usually used with triangulation and a known base line to find the location relative to two anchor transmitters.

=== Time of arrival ===
Time of arrival (ToA, also time of flight) is the amount of time a signal takes to propagate from transmitter to receiver. Because the signal propagation rate is constant and known (ignoring differences in mediums) the travel time of a signal can be used to directly calculate distance. Multiple measurements can be combined with trilateration and multilateration to find a location. This is the technique used by GPS and Ultra Wideband systems. Systems which use ToA, generally require a complicated synchronization mechanism to maintain a reliable source of time for sensors (though this can be avoided in carefully designed systems by using repeaters to establish coupling).

The accuracy of the TOA based methods often suffers from massive multipath conditions in indoor localization, which is caused by the reflection and diffraction of the RF signal from objects (e.g., interior wall, doors or furniture) in the environment. However, it is possible to reduce the effect of multipath by applying temporal or spatial sparsity based techniques.

=== Joint angle and time of arrival ===
Joint estimation of angles and times of arrival is another method of estimating the location of the user. Indeed, instead of requiring multiple access points and techniques such as triangulation and trilateration, a single access point will be able to locate a user with combined angles and times of arrival. Even more, techniques that leverage both space and time dimensions can increase the degrees of freedom of the whole system and further create more virtual resources to resolve more sources, via subspace approaches.

=== Received signal strength indication ===
Received signal strength indication (RSSI) is a measurement of the power level received by sensor. Because radio waves propagate according to the inverse-square law, distance can be approximated (typically to within 1.5 meters in ideal conditions and 2 to 4 meters in standard conditions) based on the relationship between transmitted and received signal strength (the transmission strength is a constant based on the equipment being used), as long as no other errors contribute to faulty results. The inside of buildings is not free space, so accuracy is significantly impacted by reflection and absorption from walls. Non-stationary objects such as doors, furniture, and people can pose an even greater problem, as they can affect the signal strength in dynamic, unpredictable ways.

A lot of systems use enhanced Wi-Fi infrastructure to provide location information. None of these systems serves for proper operation with any infrastructure as is. Unfortunately, Wi-Fi signal strength measurements are extremely noisy, so there is ongoing research focused on making more accurate systems

=== Other wireless technologies ===
- Radio frequency identification (RFID): passive tags are very cost-effective, but do not support any metrics
- Ultra-wideband (UWB): reduced interference with other devices
- Infrared (IR): previously included in most mobile devices
- Gen2IR (second generation infrared)
- Visible light communication (VLC), as Li-Fi: can use existing lighting systems
- Ultrasound: waves move very slowly, which results in much higher accuracy

== Other technologies ==
Non-radio technologies can be used for positioning without using the existing wireless infrastructure. This can provide increased accuracy at the expense of costly equipment and installations.

=== Magnetic positioning ===
Magnetic positioning can offer pedestrians with smartphones an indoor accuracy of 1–2 meters with 90% confidence level, without using the additional wireless infrastructure for positioning. Magnetic positioning is based on the iron inside buildings that create local variations in the Earth's magnetic field. Un-optimized compass chips inside smartphones can sense and record these magnetic variations to map indoor locations.

=== Inertial measurements ===
Pedestrian dead reckoning and other approaches for positioning of pedestrians propose an inertial measurement unit carried by the pedestrian either by measuring steps indirectly (step counting) or in a foot mounted approach, sometimes referring to maps or other additional sensors to constrain the inherent sensor drift encountered with inertial navigation. The MEMS inertial sensors suffer from internal noises which result in cubically growing position error with time. To reduce the error growth in such devices a Kalman Filtering based approach is often used. However, in order to make it capable to build map itself, the SLAM algorithm framework will be used.

Inertial measures generally cover the differentials of motion, hence the location gets determined with integrating and thus requires integration constants to provide results. The actual position estimation can be found as the maximum of a 2-d probability distribution which is recomputed at each step taking into account the noise model of all the sensors involved and the constraints posed by walls and furniture. Based on the motions and users' walking behaviors, IPS is able to estimate users' locations by machine learning algorithms.

=== Positioning based on visual markers ===
A visual positioning system can determine the location of a camera-enabled mobile device by decoding location coordinates from visual markers. In such a system, markers are placed at specific locations throughout a venue, each marker encoding that location's coordinates: latitude, longitude and height off the floor. Measuring the visual angle from the device to the marker enables the device to estimate its own location coordinates in reference to the marker. Coordinates include latitude, longitude, level and altitude off the floor. As visual markers usually are not symmetric, also the orientation of the user can be determined.

=== Location based on known visual features ===
A collection of successive snapshots from a mobile device's camera can build a database of images that is suitable for estimating location in a venue. Once the database is built, a mobile device moving through the venue can take snapshots that can be interpolated into the venue's database, yielding location coordinates. These coordinates can be used in conjunction with other location techniques for higher accuracy. Note that this can be a special case of sensor fusion where a camera plays the role of yet another sensor.

== Mathematics ==
Once sensor data has been collected, an IPS tries to determine the location from which the received transmission was most likely collected. The data from a single sensor is generally ambiguous and must be resolved by a series of statistical procedures to combine several sensor input streams.

=== Empirical method ===
One way to determine position is to match the data from the unknown location with a large set of known locations using an algorithm such as k-nearest neighbor. This technique requires a comprehensive on-site survey and will be inaccurate with any significant change in the environment (due to moving persons or moved objects).

=== Mathematical modeling ===
Location will be calculated mathematically by approximating signal propagation and finding angles and / or distance. Inverse trigonometry will then be used to determine location:

- Trilateration (distance from anchors)
- Triangulation (angle to anchors)

Advanced systems combine more accurate physical models with statistical procedures:

- Bayesian statistical analysis (probabilistic model)
- Kalman filtering (for estimating proper value streams under noise conditions).
- Sequential Monte Carlo method (for approximating the Bayesian statistical models).

== Uses ==
The major consumer benefit of indoor positioning is the expansion of location-aware mobile computing indoors. As mobile devices become ubiquitous, contextual awareness for applications has become a priority for developers. Most applications currently rely on GPS, however, and function poorly indoors. Applications benefiting from indoor location include:

- Accessibility aids for the visually impaired.
- Augmented reality
- School campus
- Museum guided tours
- Shopping malls, including hypermarkets.
- Warehouses
- Factory
- Airports, bus, train and subway stations
- Parking lots, including these in hypermarkets
- Targeted advertising
- Social networking service
- Hospitals
- Hotels
- Sports
- Cruise ships
- Indoor robotics
- Tourism
- Amusement parks
- Indoor data modeling

== See also ==
- Automatic vehicle location
- Bluetooth Low Energy
- Cyber-physical system
- Dead reckoning
- Earth's magnetic field
- Floor plans and house navigation system.
- Geolocation
- Google Indoor Maps
- GSM localization
- Home automation
- Home network
- Internet of things (IoT)
- Location-based service
- Motion planning
- Navizon
- Near field communication (NFC)
- Omlox
- Open Source Routing Machine
- Pointr
- Real-time locating system (RTLS)
- Simultaneous localization and mapping (SLAM).
- Robotic mapping
- Sensor Fusion
- Skyhook Wireless
- Visible light communication (VLC) and positioning and Li-Fi
- Wayfinding
- Wayfinding (urban or indoor)
- WebGL
