= Ambient device =

Electronic display device

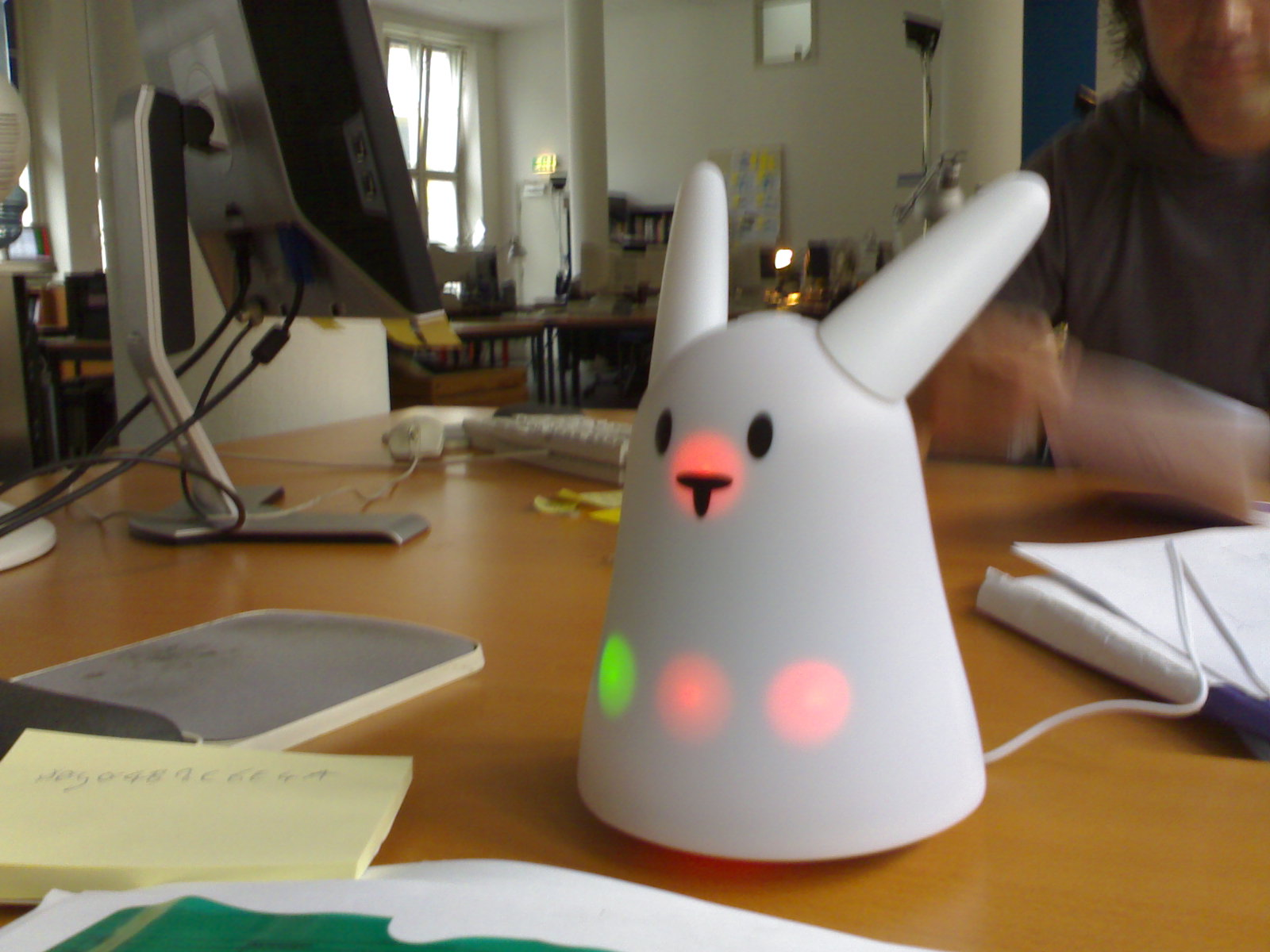
A Nabaztag device, communicating simple information to the user through its lights and the position of its ears

Ambient devices is a type of consumer electronics, characterized by their ability to be perceived at-a-glance, also known as "glanceable". Ambient devices use pre-attentive processing to display information and are aimed at minimizing mental effort. Associated fields include ubiquitous computing and calm technology. The concept is closely related to the Internet of things.

The New York Times Magazine announced ambient devices as one of its Ideas of the Year in 2002. The award recognized a start-up company, Ambient Devices, whose first product Ambient Orb, was a frosted-glass ball lamp, which maps information to a linear color spectrum and displays the trend in the data. Other products in the genre include the 2008 Chumby, and the 2012 52-LED device MooresCloud (a reference to Moore's Law) from Australia.

Research on ambient devices began at Xerox Parc, with a paper co-written by Mark Weiser and John Seely Brown, entitled Calm Computing.

== Purpose ==
The purpose of ambient devices is to enable immediate and effortless access to information. The original developers of the idea state that an ambient device is designed to provide support to people carrying out everyday activities. Ambient devices decrease the effort needed to process incoming data, thus rendering individuals more productive.

The key issue lies with taking Internet-based content (e.g. traffic congestion, weather condition, stock market quotes) and mapping it into a single, usually one-dimensional spectrum (e.g. angle, colour). According to Rose, this presents data to an end user seamlessly, with an insignificant amount of cognitive load.

== History ==
The concept of ambient devices can be traced back to the early 2000s, when preliminary research was carried at Xerox PARC, according to the company’s official website. The MIT Media Lab website lists the venture as founded by David L. Rose, Ben Resner, Nabeel Hyatt and Pritesh Gandhi as a lab spin-off.

== Examples ==
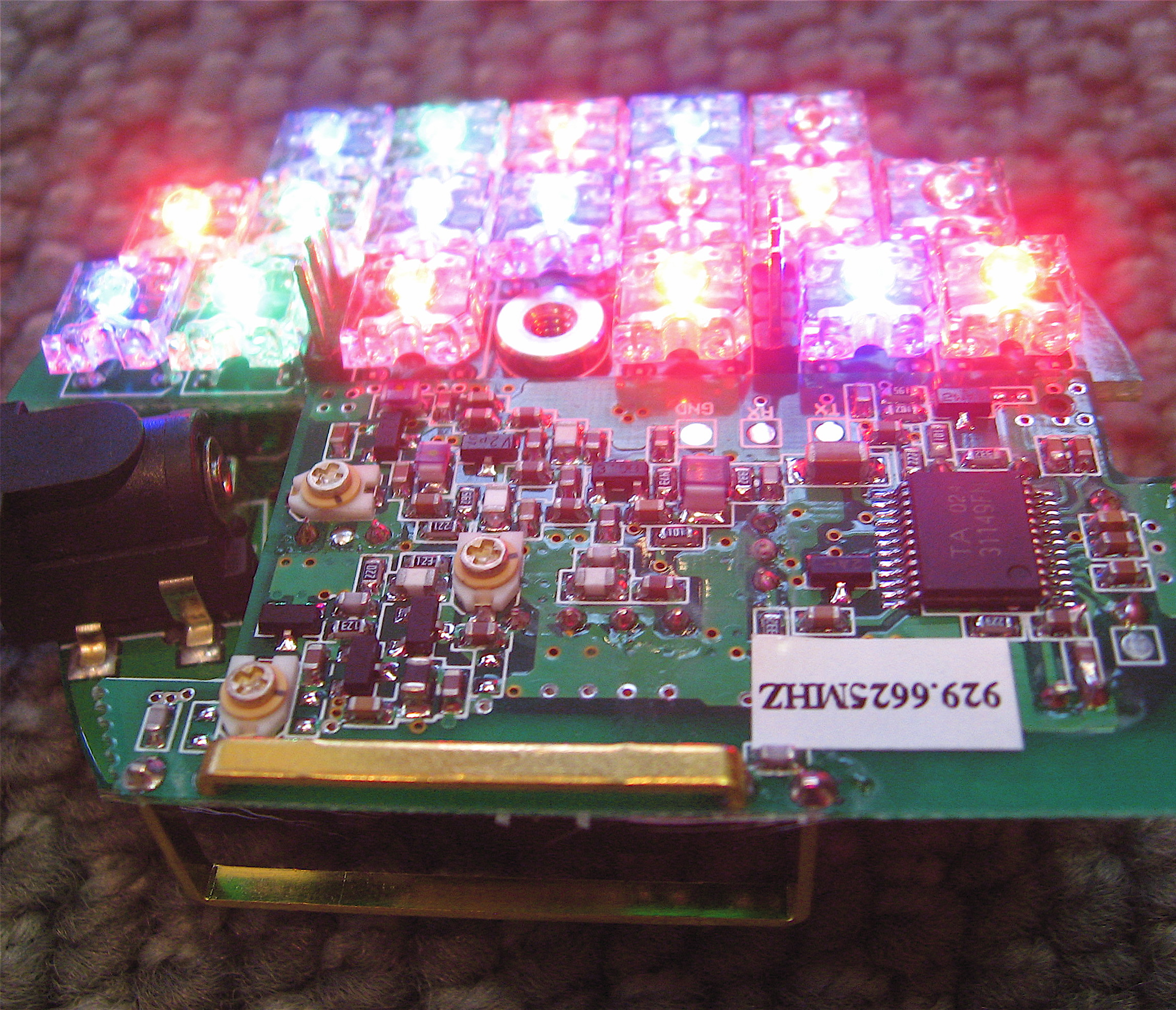
Interior LED array of an Ambient Orb

Ambient Orb was introduced by Ambient Devices in 2002. The device was a glowing sphere that displayed data through changes in color. Ambient Orb was customizable in terms of content and its subsequent visual representation. For instance, when the device was set to monitor a stock market index (e.g. NASDAQ), the Orb glowed green/red to represent the upward/downward price movements; alternatively, it turned amber when the index is unchanged. Nabeel Hyatt stated that the device was marketed as an interior design item with additional functionality.

Another prominent ambient device is Chumby, released in 2008. It served as an at-a-glance widget station. Chumby was able to push relevant customizable data (weather, news, music, photos) to a touchscreen through Wi-Fi. It greatly surpassed the products resembling Ambient Orb, in terms of functionality, and was proclaimed one of the top gadgets of 2008, production ceased in April 2012. Since 1 July 2014 Chumby is available only as a paid subscription service.

More recent products such as Amazon Alexa can be seen as adopting the spirit of ambient devices, in that they operate in the background, responding to both users and external data sources.

== See also ==
- Information appliance
