= Smart object =

Product able to gather and exchange data

A smart object is an object that enhances the interaction with not only people but also with other smart objects. Also known as smart connected products or smart connected things (SCoT), they are products, assets and other things embedded with processors, sensors, software and connectivity that allow data to be exchanged between the product and its environment, manufacturer, operator/user, and other products and systems. Connectivity also enables some capabilities of the product to exist outside the physical device, in what is known as the product cloud. The data collected from these products can be then analysed to inform decision-making, enable operational efficiencies and continuously improve the performance of the product.

It can not only refer to interaction with physical world objects but also to interaction with virtual (computing environment) objects. A smart physical object may be created either as an artifact or manufactured product or by embedding electronic tags such as RFID tags or sensors into non-smart physical objects. Smart virtual objects are created as software objects that are intrinsic when creating and operating a virtual or cyber world simulation or game. The concept of a smart object has several origins and uses, see History. There are also several overlapping terms, see also smart device, tangible object or tangible user interface and Thing as in the Internet of things.

== History ==
In the early 1990s, Mark Weiser, from whom the term ubiquitous computing originated, referred to a vision "When almost every object either contains a computer or can have a tab attached to it, obtaining information will be trivial", Although Weiser did not specifically refer to an object as being smart, his early work did imply that smart physical objects are smart in the sense that they act as digital information sources. Hiroshi Ishii and Brygg Ullmer refer to tangible objects in terms of tangibles bits or tangible user interfaces that enable users to "grasp & manipulate" bits in the center of users' attention by coupling the bits with everyday physical objects and architectural surfaces.

The smart object concept was introduced by Marcelo Kallman and Daniel Thalmann as an object that can describe its own possible interactions. The main focus here is to model interactions of smart virtual objects with virtual humans, agents, in virtual worlds. The opposite approach to smart objects is 'plain' objects that do not provide this information. The additional information provided by this concept enables far more general interaction schemes, and can greatly simplify the planner of an artificial intelligence agent.

In contrast to smart virtual objects used in virtual worlds, Lev Manovich focuses on physical space filled with electronic and visual information. Here, "smart objects" are described as "objects connected to the Net; objects that can sense their users and display smart behaviour".

More recently in the early 2010s, smart objects are being proposed as a key enabler for the vision of the Internet of things. The combination of the Internet and emerging technologies such as near field communications, real-time localization, and embedded sensors enables everyday objects to be transformed into smart objects that can understand and react to their environment. Such objects are building blocks for the Internet of things and enable novel computing applications. In 2018, one of the world's first smart houses was built in Klaukkala, Finland in the form of a five-floor apartment block, using the Kone Residential Flow solution created by KONE, allowing even a smartphone to act as a home key.

== Characteristics ==
Although we can view interaction with physical smart object in the physical world as distinct from interaction with virtual smart objects in a virtual simulated world, these can be related. Poslad considers the progression of: how

- humans use models of smart objects situated in the physical world to enhance human to physical world interaction; versus how
- smart physical objects situated in the physical world can model human interaction in order to lessen the need for human to physical world interaction; versus how
- virtual smart objects by modelling both physical world objects and modelling humans as objects and their subsequent interactions can form a predominantly smart virtual object environment.

=== Smart physical objects ===
The concept smart for a smart physical object simply means that it is active, digital, networked, can operate to some extent autonomously, is reconfigurable and has local control of the resources it needs such as energy, data storage, etc. Note, a smart object does not necessarily need to be intelligent as in exhibiting a strong essence of artificial intelligence—although it can be designed to also be intelligent.

Physical world smart objects can be described in terms of three properties:

- Awareness: is a smart object's ability to understand (that is, sense, interpret, and react to) events and human activities occurring in the physical world.
- Representation: refers to a smart object's application and programming model—in particular, programming abstractions.
- Interaction: denotes the object's ability to converse with the user in terms of input, output, control, and feedback.

Based upon these properties, these have been classified into three types:

- Activity-Aware Smart Objects: Are objects that can record information about work activities and its own use.
- Policy-Aware Smart Objects: Are objects that are activity-aware Objects can interpret events and activities with respect to predefined organizational policies.
- Process-Aware Smart Objects: Processes play a fundamental role in industrial work management and operation. A process is a collection of related activities or tasks that are ordered according to their position in time and space.

=== Smart virtual objects ===
For the virtual object in a virtual world case, an object is called smart when it has the ability to describe its possible interactions. This focuses on constructing a virtual world using only virtual objects that contain their own interaction information. There are four basic elements to constructing such a smart virtual object framework.

- Object properties: physical properties and a text description
- Interaction information: position of handles, buttons, grips, and the like
- Object behavior: different behaviors based on state variables
- Agent behaviors: description of the behavior an agent should follow when using the object

Some versions of smart objects also include animation information in the object information, but this is not considered to be an efficient approach, since this can make objects inappropriately oversized.

=== Categorization ===
The terms smart, connected product or smart product can be confusing as it is used to cover a broad range of different products, ranging from smart home appliances (e.g., smart bathroom scales or smart light bulbs) to smart cars (e.g., Tesla). While these products share certain similarities, they often differ substantially in their capabilities. Raff et al. developed a conceptual framework that distinguishes different smart products based on their capabilities, which features 4 types of smart product archetypes (in ascending order of "smartness").

- Digital
- Connected
- Responsive
- Intelligent

== Advantages ==
Smart, connected products have three primary components:

- Physical – made up of the product's mechanical and electrical parts.
- Smart – made up of sensors, microprocessors, data storage, controls, software, and an embedded operating system with enhanced user interface.
- Connectivity – made up of ports, antennae, and protocols enabling wired/Wireless connections that serve two purposes, it allows data to be exchanged with the product and enables some functions of the product to exist outside the physical device.

Each component expands the capabilities of one another resulting in "a virtuous cycle of value improvement". First, the smart components of a product amplify the value and capabilities of the physical components. Then, connectivity amplifies the value and capabilities of the smart components. These improvements include:

- Monitoring of the product's conditions, its external environment, and its operations and usage.
- Control of various product functions to better respond to changes in its environment, as well as to personalize the user experience.
- Optimization of the product's overall operations based on actual performance data, and reduction of downtimes through predictive maintenance and remote service.
- Autonomous product operation, including learning from their environment, adapting to users' preferences and self-diagnosing and service.

=== The Internet of things (IoT) ===
The Internet of things is the network of physical objects that contain embedded technology to communicate and sense or interact with their internal states or the external environment. The phrase "Internet of things" reflects the growing number of smart, connected products and highlights the new opportunities they can represent. The Internet, whether involving people or things, is a mechanism for transmitting information. What makes smart, connected products fundamentally different is not the Internet, but the changing nature of the 'things'. Once a product is smart and connected to the cloud, the products and services will become part of an interconnected management solution. Companies can evolve from making products to offering more complex, higher-value offerings within a "system of systems".

== See also ==
- AmbieSense
- Audiocubes
- Home network
- Intelligent maintenance system
- Nabaztag
- Smart city
- Smart speaker
- Wearable technology
- Ubiquitous computing
