= David L. Rose =

American entrepreneur and author

- Rose in 2014
- Born: February 19, 1967 (age 59); Chapel Hill, North Carolina
- Education: St. Olaf College (BA); Harvard University (MEd)
- Occupations: Entrepreneur, author, product designer
- Known for: Ambient Orb, GlowCap, Enchanted Objects, SuperSight
- Website: enchantedobjects.com

David L. Rose (born February 19, 1967) is an American product designer, entrepreneur, and author. He is the CEO and co-founder of LOOKOUT, a marine AI safety company, and a former lecturer at the MIT Media Lab. Rose is the author of two books on technology and design: Enchanted Objects (2014) and SuperSight (2021).

== Early life and education ==
Rose was born on February 19, 1967, in Chapel Hill, North Carolina. He graduated from Madison West High School in Madison, Wisconsin in 1985 and obtained a BA in Physics and Fine Arts from St. Olaf College in 1989. He then earned a master's degree in technology in education from Harvard University in 1992.

== Career ==
=== Early ventures (1992–2002) ===
Rose established Interactive Factory in 1992 after gaining experience as a software engineer in speech recognition and robotics. The company created interactive museum exhibits, educational software, and smart toys, including the award-winning LEGO Mindstorms Robotic Invention System. The company, now known as iFactory, operates as a division of RDW Group.

After Interactive Factory's acquisition in 1997, Rose patented the first online photo-sharing service and founded Opholio. The start-up was acquired by Flashpoint Technology in 2000. Rose then established Viant's Innovation Center, where he was director for four years, working with Fortune 500 clients including Sony, General Motors, Schwab, Sprint, and Kinko's. He helped build Viant to over 900 people, $140M in revenue, and a successful IPO.

=== Ambient Devices (2002–2008) ===
In 2002, Rose co-founded Ambient Devices, a spin-off from the MIT Media Lab and a pioneer in embedding Internet information in everyday objects. One of Rose's inventions was the Ambient Orb. The company developed over a dozen internet-connected objects, including the Ambient Umbrella, the Ambient Dashboard, the 5-day Weather Forecaster, and the Energy Joule. The company was funded by Nicholas Negroponte and Hiroshi Ishii.

=== Vitality and GlowCap (2008–2011) ===
In 2008, Rose founded Vitality, a high-tech healthcare startup where he conceived and led the development of the GlowCap, the first cellular-connected pill cap. The product was proven in randomized clinical trials to increase medication adherence to over 90% and was a recipient of the 2010 Medical Design Excellence Awards. Vitality was acquired in 2011 by biotech investor Patrick Soon-Shiong and rolled into NantHealth.

=== Ditto Labs (2012–2017) ===
Rose was the founder and CEO of Ditto Labs, a Cambridge, Massachusetts-based startup focused on image-recognition software that analyzed visual social media content for brand insights using computer vision for logo detection and scene understanding.

=== IDEO (2017) ===
In 2017, Rose was a futurist-in-residence at IDEO, where he worked with a team to design and prototype gesture-based interactions and developed computer vision technology for people to perform one and two-handed gestures to control light and sound in the environment. Rose filmed dancers, American Sign Language teachers, mimes, and an orchestra conductor to learn about the communicative power of subtle gestures. He published "Why Gesture is the Next Big Thing in Design" on the IDEO Blog.

=== Warby Parker (2017–2019) ===
Rose was the VP of Vision Technology at Warby Parker from 2017 to 2019, where his team built the award-winning virtual try-on application using computer vision and machine learning, leveraging the iPhone X TrueDepth camera for face measurement and frame fitting.

=== LOOKOUT (2020–present) ===
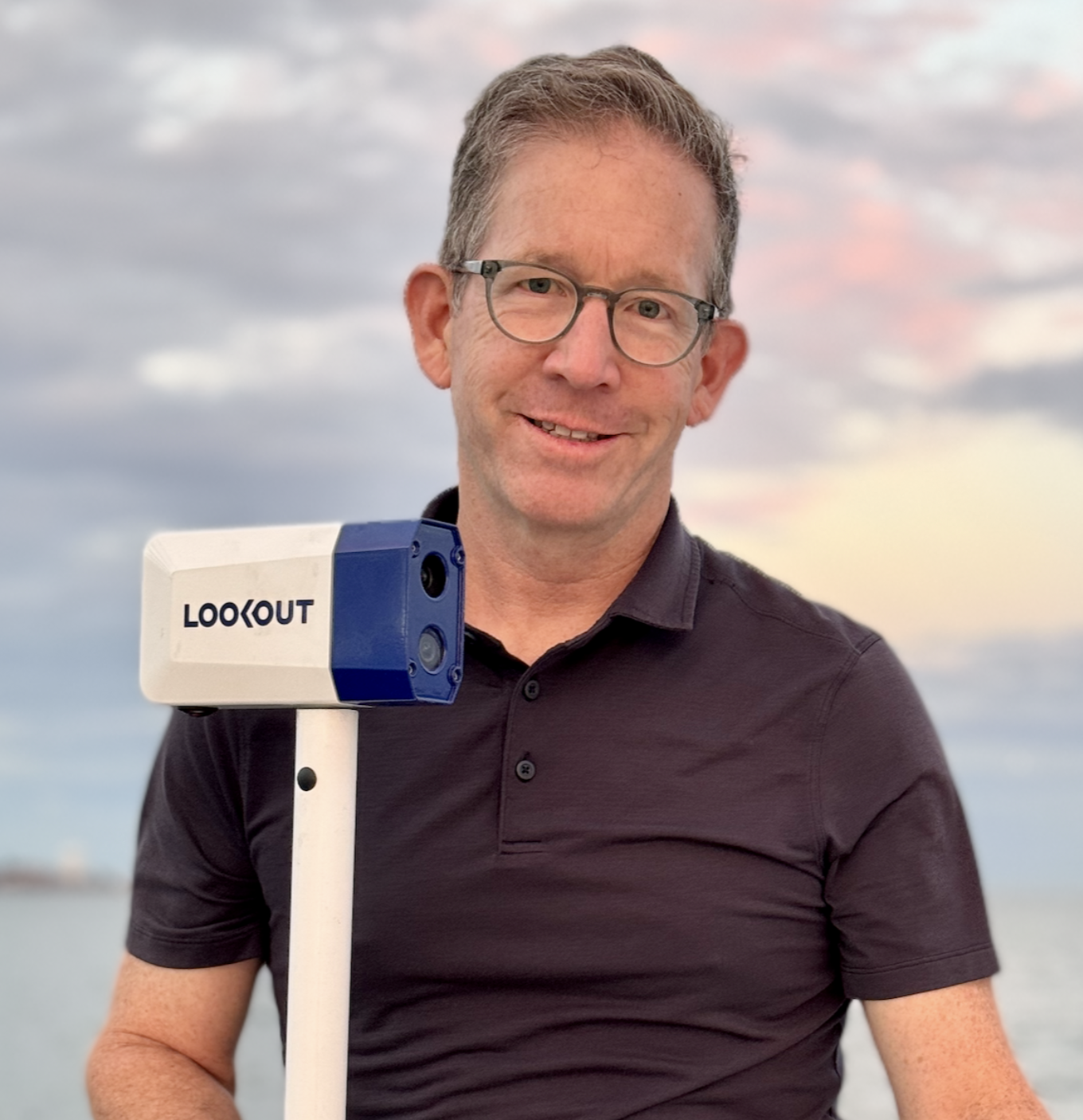
David Rose with the LOOKOUT AI camera for safe boating

In 2020, Rose co-founded LOOKOUT, where he serves as CEO. LOOKOUT develops computer vision systems for marine collision avoidance, detecting vessels, debris, whales, and people in the water using AI-powered object detection. The company has deployed over 100 systems globally, with integration to marine electronics from Garmin, Furuno, Raymarine, and Simrad.

In 2025, LOOKOUT won the IBEX Innovation Award for OEM Electronics, judged by Boating Writers International and selected from 112 entries.

Rose holds multiple patents related to the technology, including patents on obstacle avoidance systems, situational awareness, dynamic lighting control, and projecting bathymetric data in augmented reality.

=== Other roles ===
Rose also was the Chief Technology Officer and advisor for Home Outside, an AI landscape design service that uses computer vision and scene segmentation on aerial and street view images to automatically redesign residential landscapes.

Rose was a Fellow at Samsung Electronics (2016), advising on emerging technology platforms including augmented reality, wearables, and ambient computing. He was also a Fellow at Gensler (2015), where he created the Balance Table (with Tellart) for Salesforce—interactive furniture that uses real-time illumination to show speaker participation and promote conversational balance.

== Academic career ==
Rose lectured at the MIT Media Lab from 2008 to 2020, co-teaching courses in the Tangible Media Group with Hiroshi Ishii and in City Science with Kent Larson. He also taught a course called "Enchanted Architecture" at the MIT School of Architecture and Planning.

Rose has taught information visualization at Harvard Graduate School of Design and was faculty at the Copenhagen Institute of Interaction Design (CIID). He is on the advisory board of the Dubai Institute of Design and Innovation (DIDI), a university established in collaboration with MIT and Parsons School of Design.

== Books ==
In July 2014, Rose published Enchanted Objects: Design, Human Desire, and the Internet of Things (Scribner). Rose argues that the cell phone monopolizes attention and that there is an opportunity to unglue society from these screens by spreading apps into everyday objects like clothing, jewelry, and rooms. The book is widely adopted in design curricula.

In 2021, Rose published his second book, SuperSight: What Augmented Reality Means for Our Lives, Our Work, and the Way We Imagine the Future (BenBella Books). The book received the National Indie Excellence Award for Nonfiction and the Independent Publisher Book Award Bronze Medal in Science.

Rose is currently working on a third book, Dancing with AI, about human-AI collaboration frameworks.

== Patents ==
Rose has been granted numerous patents by the US Patent Office, which have been licensed by some of the largest technology companies in the world. His patents include:

- Online Photo Sharing System and Method (1997) — the first patent for web-based photo sharing
- Ambient Information Display Systems — multiple patents covering glanceable displays and calm technology interfaces
- Interactive Television Systems — patents covering two-way interactive TV experiences
- Connected Medical Device Systems — patents covering wireless medication adherence monitoring
- Dynamic Lighting Control — patents on adaptive illumination systems
- Obstacle Avoidance Systems — patents on computer vision-based hazard detection
- Situational Awareness Systems — patents on sensor fusion and environmental perception
- Augmented Reality Bathymetric Projection — patents on projecting underwater terrain data in AR displays

== Museum collections ==
Rose's Ambient Orb is in the permanent collection of the Museum of Modern Art (MoMA) in New York. The GlowCap was exhibited at the Design Museum in London. Multiple works including the Ambient Orb, Ambient Umbrella, GlowCap, Google Earth Table, and Balance Table were featured in the "Wicked Smart" exhibit at the Boston Museum of Science.

== Media appearances ==
Rose appeared on The Daily Show with Jon Stewart in August 2014 to discuss Enchanted Objects and the Internet of Things. His work has been parodied on The Colbert Report.

Rose is represented as a keynote speaker by The Lavin Agency and has spoken at TEDxBeaconStreet, TEDxBerkeley, South by Southwest, the Institute for the Future, and CES 2025. He has been featured in The New York Times, WIRED, The Economist, Forbes, The Wall Street Journal, Fast Company, and MIT Technology Review.

Rose has appeared on podcasts including the Singularity University Feedback Loop, The Informed Life, and Product Mastery Now.

== Selected writing ==
- "Choice Architecture: Designing AI Quizzes and Chatbot Conversations That Make Humans Feel Understood" (Medium, 2022)
- "The AR ↔ VR Reality Slider Presented by BMW at CES 2023" (Medium, 2023)
- "Why Gesture is the Next Big Thing in Design" (IDEO Blog, 2017)

== Personal life ==
Rose lives in Brookline, Massachusetts with his wife and two children.
