= Intelligent environment =

Intelligent Environments (IE) are spaces with embedded systems and information and communication technologies creating interactive spaces that bring computation into the physical world and enhance occupants experiences. "Intelligent environments are spaces in which computation is seamlessly used to enhance ordinary activity. One of the driving forces behind the emerging interest in highly interactive environments is to make computers not only genuine user-friendly but also essentially invisible to the user".

IEs describe physical environments in which information and communication technologies and sensor systems disappear as they become embedded into physical objects, infrastructures, and the surroundings in which we live, travel and work. The goal here is to allow computers to take part in activities never previously involved and allow people to interact with computers via gesture, voice, movement, and context.

== Origins ==
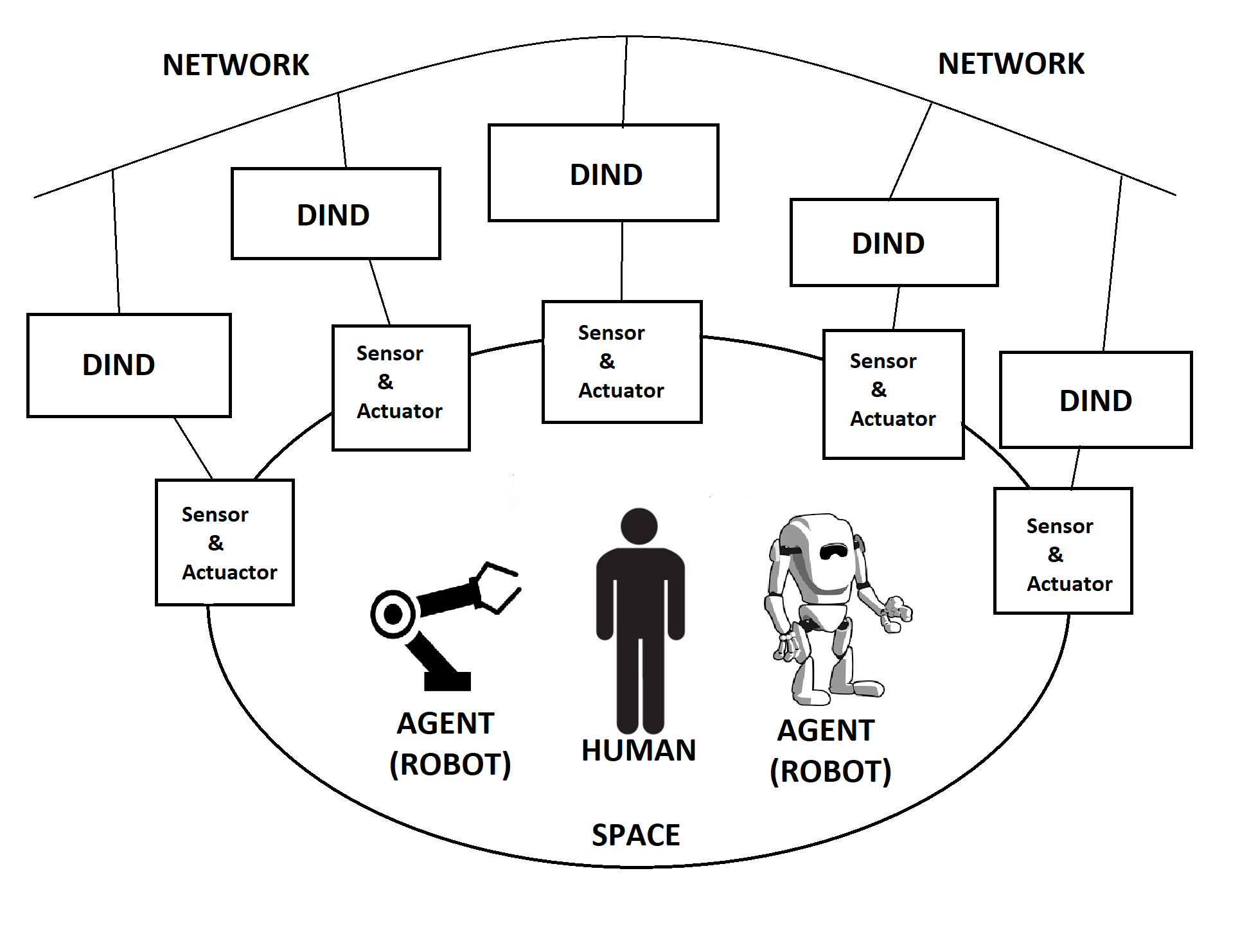
Conceptual figure of Intelligent Space (by J.-H. Lee and H. Hashimoto)

The idea of having an artificial intelligence capable of managing an environment, recollect data, and respond in consequence is older than we would expect. In the novel 2001: A Space Odyssey from 1968, long before the microcomputers revolution, you have the fictional character HAL 9000, a computer capable of controlling the different sensors and systems of the environment and using them as extensions of itself. The character Proteus from the 1973 novel Demon Seed also portrays the same characteristics of an artificial intelligence controlling an embedded environment. By the time these two novels were released, the idea of a computer controlling the environment that surrounds us was not broadly accepted by the community since both characters played the role of evil machines whose only objectives included the control over humans.

The term 'Intelligent environments' is a concept and expression originally created by Peter Droege for his homonymous Elsevier publication of 1997, a project that commenced in 1986. The 1986 project was his winning entry into the Campus City Kawasaki competition in Japan, seeking to apply the benefits of information technology and advanced telecommunications to an entire city, its societal empowerment, trans-industrial prosperity and, above all, its environmental redemption.

It is not until 1991 with the introduction of ubiquitous computing by Mark Weiser when we start seeing an inclination from the scientific community to study the area of computing outside of the typical machine with a keyboard and a screen. It became something that could be potentially implemented into anything that surrounds us, proposing casual access to computing to any user. In 1996 Hashimoto Laboratory at the University of Tokyo developed the first research on intelligent spaces. J.-H. Lee and H. Hashimoto designed a room with a homemade three-dimensional tracking sensor and mobile robots, all this connected to a network. The idea was for the robots to support the person in the room with different tasks with the help of vision cameras and computer sets, becoming one of the first intelligent environment.

At first, intelligent spaces were designed with the only objective to help people with physical tasks. Robots included in the room would help people to grab objects as well as support people with disabilities to do certain jobs. This idea started shifting into the concept we have today of intelligent environments, not only an environment to support people but also robots. The intelligent space became a platform that extends the censorial capacity of anything connected to it. If we start designing products, either software or hardware around this intelligent environments, the effort needed to complete all kinds of tasks would be drastically reduced.

== Challenges ==
Practical implementation of intelligent environments implies the solution of many challenges. Pervasive computing systems embedded in IE need to be proactive and to accomplish this, it is crucial that systems can track and determine the users' intent. The challenge here is finding that action that supposedly will help the user rather than hinder him. As of right now, algorithms behind the intelligent environments are constantly being reworked by the simple method of trial and error in artificial environments. It is not until a programmer can see an accurate enough level of prediction for the product to become commercialized. The degree of accuracy of intelligent environments depends on the task they want to accomplish. Some simple actions that do not substantially affect the user can admit more failures in the predictions than other functions that hold more responsibility. Still, there are always actions that cannot be fully predicted by the IE and needs some input from the user to be completed. One of the most significant challenges as of right now is determining which are those actions that are required for user input and how to create algorithms capable of eliminating that input so that the usability of the systems improves.

By the other hand, pro-activity of such environments has to be handled very carefully. Pervasive computing systems are supposed to be minimally intrusive and at the same time be capable of taking decisions that will help users. One way to achieve that is making those systems capable of modifying their behavior based on the user's state and surroundings. Here again, some challenges arise: What are the required data and information that a system needs to be context-aware? How frequently should that information be measured and consulted without hurting system performance? The goal is to create an IE capable of reacting fast and accurate to the needs and inputs of the user so it would be unnecessary for the sensors to record information that will not help the algorithms make the correct action to what is happening. Recognizing important data and filtering the environment to search for the appropriate place to obtain it results in a great challenge.

It is crucial for pervasive computing systems to find the right level of pro-activity and transparency without annoying the user. Systems can infer the user's needs for pro-activity based on his level of expertise on a particular task. Self-tuning can be crucial for accomplishing this goal.

As the Intelligent Environments Conference (2007) points out: "Types of Intelligent Environments range from private to public and from fixed to mobile; some are ephemeral while others are permanent; some change type during their lifespan. The realization of Intelligent Environments requires the convergence of different disciplines: Information and Computer Science, Architecture, Material Engineering, Artificial Intelligence, Sociology, and Design. Besides, technical breakthroughs are required in key enabling technology fields, such as microelectronics (e.g., miniaturization, power consumption), communication and networking technologies (e.g., broadband and wireless networks), smart materials (e.g., bio-implants) and intelligent agents (e.g., context awareness)". The correct integration of all of these components is crucial to developing a useful IE.

== Applications ==
=== Business ===
One of the main areas that will experience a significant impact on the emergence of IE is business relations. The way companies interact with each other and with people will suffer the most significant impact. Their relationships will become more dynamic and should emphasize a more flexible approach to businesses, trying to adapt to the continually changing commercial environment. Such flexibility should also be reflected also on their employees and their work environment. Even today, companies that have shown significant levels of flexibility on their working environments and with their employees (as at Microsoft or Google) have increasing levels of productivity and employees retention.

Another critical issue that companies must take into account in the IE era is the way they approach the privacy of their clients. The success of these future companies will depend significantly on how people feel more confident in the use they give to their personal information. Another essential key to the success of these prospective businesses will be to allow the end user to have control over the way in which the IE systems make the decisions. Friendly user configurations should enable them to be in control of these systems but at the time is one of the biggest challenges for systems engineers.

=== Leisure Activities ===
New ways of entertainment have emerged since the creation of IE. There have been several experiments in museums where this technology is used to create a more interactive experience that makes the visitors not only experience history with their eyes but also feel in all of their senses. From the use of sounds and lights that adapt according to the expositions presented to the incorporation of smells that define unique environments, there are endless opportunities to the application of IE into this sort of entertainment.

The same concept can be used to not only improve existent leisure experiences but also to create new ones. Artistic expression has had a significant influence on this since we have seen new forms of art using Artificial Intelligence and IE. Take for example the work of the artist Chris Milk where you can see the implementation of immersive installations that make the user not only appreciate a work of art but also be part of it. One of his most important work of arts, "The Treachery of Sanctuary" uses projections of the users' bodies in different screens to explore the creative process by using generated digital birds. These types of art require the user's interaction to exist.

=== Health Care ===
One of the most critical applications of Intelligent Environments is in the Healthcare Industry. You can use IE in the hospital's rooms to monitor the state of the patients without the patient even noticing, which results in less disturbance to those patients who need extraordinary amounts of rest and fewer efforts for nurses that are no longer required to check on patients regularly. This technology could substantially change the way in which hospitals and clinics are designed since nurses can be more efficient with their time attending patients in critical needs without leaving other patients under the care of intelligent rooms. This unique installations will no longer monitor the patient's health and notify the nurses, but it could also be programmed to interact with them with preventative purposes by administering specific drugs or directly delivering food when needed.

Caring of frail, elderly patients could dramatically change in the future with the use of IE. By introducing this technology into their own homes, we will be able to monitor a patient from anywhere we are without having the need to transporting them to hospitals or clinics to have proper care. This could transform nearly any house into an intelligent nursing home care, allowing families to save lots of money by dramatically reducing the cost of care.

=== Emergency Response ===
Preventing is the best way to fighting a possible problem and there is no better way to do so that gathering information prior to a problematic event that helps us know when it would happen. IE would provide the perfect way to gather the data necessary to predict hazards and possible problems in the future. If we implement IE in our houses, it could notify, for example, the fire department if a fire is about to happen without us even noticing, or the police department if suspicious activity is detected in the proximity of our homes. In the best scenario, the event would not happen since the IE will help us create a diagnosis of the environment where it is implemented so that we could attack possible issues long before it happens. This will substantially improve live conditions in the cities, and a substantial economic impact since less hazardous events would happen, preventing material loss.

=== Environmental Monitoring ===
Intelligent Environments will help us monitor different natural environments at a much higher precision and granularity than the currently used techniques. By having access to a richer and more significant data, it will not only help us to control the environment for possible hazards, but it will also change the way in which we understand it, making us improve the current theories and models of environmental processes. As of today, this technology is being used to study phenomena such as coastal erosion, flooding and the movement of glacial. We know very little about the why of many natural processes that are currently affecting us and having more accurate and precise data will significantly improve the way in which we attack those issues so that we not only make humans more environmentally friendly but also improve the health of our planet.

== See also ==
- Augmented reality
- Blended Space
- Intelligent street
- Internet of Things
- Mixed reality
- Smart beach
- Smart city
- Smart device
- Smart home
- Smart objects
- Smart-M3
- Ubiquitous computing
