= Wiliot =

Israeli-American technology company

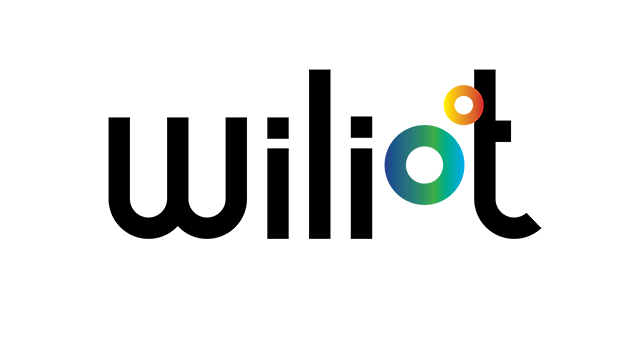
- Type: Private
- Industry: Technology
- Founded: 2017; 9 years ago in Israel
- Founders: Tal Tamir; Yaron Elboim; Alon Yehezkely
- Headquarters: Caesarea, Israel
- Area served: Worldwide
- Products: IoT Pixels; Cloud
- Number of employees: 130 (2022)
- Website: wiliot.com

Wiliot is a startup company developing Internet of Things technology for supply-chains and asset tracking, founded in 2017 and based in Caesarea, Israel, with customer operations in San Diego, US.

Wiliot produces battery-free printable sensor tags designed to collect and transmit data from products like groceries, apparel and pharmaceuticals from their sources to stores and homes. The company generates revenue by offering subscriptions for its cloud software and licensing of its chip technology to third-party manufacturers.

== History ==
Wiliot was founded in 2017 by Tal Tamir, Yaron Elboim, and Alon Yehezkely, following the sale of their previous startup Wilocity to Qualcomm in 2014.

In 2019, Wiliot closed a $30 million series B round of funding from Amazon, Avery Dennison, Samsung and its previous series A investors Norwest Venture Partners, 83North Venture Capital, Grove Ventures, Qualcomm Ventures, and M Ventures. Other early investors include PepsiCo, NTT Docomo Ventures, and Vintage Investment Partners.

In 2021 Wiliot raised $200 million in a series C funding round led by SoftBank Vision Fund 2 and backed by all previous investors.

== Technology ==
Wiliot's tags, called IoT Pixels, are a postage stamp-sized printed computer that powers itself by harvesting the energy from surrounding Wi-Fi, cellular and Bluetooth radio signals. The IoT Pixel tags are used for temperature monitoring and for collecting data used to determine the location and proximity of tagged objects. A humidity-sensing version was introduced in 2023. The tags cost approximately 10 cents a piece.

The IoT Pixel includes an ARM Cortex-M0+ processor core, Bluetooth Low Energy connectivity, 1 kB of non-volatile memory, and antennas for Bluetooth and energy harvesting. Dual-band models include connectivity in the ISM bands.

In 2022, Wiliot introduced a business card-sized battery-assisted version of the IoT Pixel, developed with Identiv.

Data from the sensors is fed into a Wiliot Cloud server, where algorithms help its customers make decisions through a software as a service subscription.

Wiliot has filed patents relating to wireless sensing, radio-frequency energy harvesting and antenna technology.

== Applications ==
Wiliot's tags are designed for use in the many crates that agriculture shippers use to get their products to markets. The tags can provide information about the safety of the journey and the condition of perishable goods, to manage inventory and reduce waste. Its first large public customer was Israeli supermarket chain Shufersal in June, 2022.

The Japan Research Institute has experimented with reducing food loss throughout the food supply chain from producers to stores and in consumers’ homes, using Wiliot's tags to monitor the temperature and presence of products stored in refrigerators.

Wiliot's tags have also been tested in pharmaceutical and apparel applications.

== Recognition ==
Wiliot has received the following awards and recognition:

- Winner of the 2019 CableLabs Innovation Showcase
- Joint winner of the FDA’s Low- or No-Cost Food Traceability Challenge 2021
- Frost & Sullivan’s 2022 North American Battery-free Bluetooth Low Energy Tag Technology Innovation Leadership Award
- Frost & Sullivan's 2022 European Passive BLE-based IoT Solutions Customer Value Leadership Award
- 2022 SXSW Innovation Awards Finalist in the Smart Cities, Transportation & Delivery category

== See also ==
- Ambient IoT
