= AmbieSense =

AmbieSense was a large European project funded by the Information Society Technologies, Fifth Framework Programme of the European Commission (EU-IST 2001-34244). A company has been formed of the same name and has contributed to initiatives such as the open source Webinos project.

== Objectives ==
The AmbieSense looks into the future of the ambient intelligence landscape. Miniature and wireless context tags are mounted in everyday surroundings and situations. The tags are smart objects embedded in the environment of people with mobile devices. Project vision: "Relevant information to the right situation and user". The resulting AmbieSense technology and applications gave good inspiration to several of the later Sixth Framework Programme (FP6) projects.

== Project impact - from idea to market ==
People have referred to the AmbieSense project as: "turning the mobile operator model on its head". The invented system enables new and flexible business models for the distribution, delivery, and interaction with mobile information. Applications for travel and tourism were implemented for Oslo Airport, Gardermoen and Seville city centre, in which also Lonely Planet was involved as content provider. The piloting of the applications and technologies were well received, which led to the commercialisation of the project outcome (see: External links below).

== AmbieSense main components ==
An AmbieSense system includes three cornerstones:

- Wireless context tags populated in the environment
- A content service provider
- The users with mobile phones

The system integrates context tags with information from content service providers. The mobile information was both from a general travel guide publisher and local information providers.

Content service providers are able to provide online information directly to a user or also via tags mounted in various strategic places thus creating an information zone. Information can be uploaded from remote via WiFi or Ethernet (by content service provider or building owners, for example, and is accessible locally by the user who is in that environment and situation, via Bluetooth push and/or pull. For example, in the context of an ambient travel guide, the historic and cultural web pages, local sights, shops, maps, and local events can be communicated to the mobile phones.

Web pages and other multi-media content were relayed and distributed via the tags. One of the applications, the travel guide for mobile phones was also presented on EuroNews HiTech, a TV-program and web-column, January 6, 2005.

The users can also receive recommendations or search results based on their context. These may be explicitly stated, implicitly derived through accessing their search behaviour, or use environment information from the context tags.

== Other dissemination results ==
Press coverage in many newspapers in Spain, Scotland, Germany, and Norway (both online and paper versions). Three Spanish radio stations, one Spanish TV-channel, and the international channel EuroNews. Several articles found in Gemini, a popular scientific magazine in Norway. Additional information can be found on various web sites in the world. News items in IST Results web (Europe), Association for Computing Machinery (ACM) Bulletin web (United States), and EuroNews web.
