= Ubiquitous commerce =

Ubiquitous Commerce also known as U-Commerce, u commerce or uCommerce (not 'U.Commerce'), refers to a variety of goods and/or services. Sometimes, it is used to refer to the wireless, continuous communication and exchange of data and information between and among retailers, customers, and systems (e.g., applications) regardless of location, devices used, or time of day.

Sometimes, U-Commerce is taken as the generic term for all business transactions through or by means of information and communications technology (ICT).

== Core Concepts ==
According to Richard T. Watson, U-Commerce includes four major features:

- Ubiquitous = represents the ability to be connect at any time and in any place as well as the integration of human-computer interaction into most devices and processes, e.g. household objects.
- Uniqueness = stands for the unique identification of each customer or user regarding his identity, current context, needs and location resulting in an individual service.
- Universal = is related to everyone’s devices which can be used multifunctional and as well as universal –you will always be connected no matter of your place.
- Unison = constitutes the data integration across applications and devices to provide users consistent and fully access to required information independent of device and location. The term unison also relates to fully synchronised devices at any time.

== Technologies ==
U-Commerce is described as the evolution of E-Commerce and M-Commerce also combining the areas of V-commerce, Television-Commerce (T-commerce) as well as Silent-Commerce (S-Commerce).

Ubiquitous Commerce is thus based on various ICT components. These technologies were driving forces for the evolution to business transactions at any time and in any place and so they will be in the future:

- Internet as the fundamental technology and source
- mobile data services regarding M-Commerce which are especially Wireless LAN, UMTS, HSDPA and in the future 4G / WiMAX
- TV technologies/add-ons like Teletext and increasingly IPTV
- technologies enhancing the communication of devices (EDI, XML, Web service)

In addition, there are also technologies regarding the concept of Ubiquitous Computing which are and will be the main driving forces for the Ubiquitous Commerce. These are mainly the following:

- technologies of M2M communication, which include some of the technologies mentioned above
- methods for the automatic identification and data capture (Auto-ID) e.g. GPS und RFID
- in the future also smart and self-organizing devices/systems and the related technologies like sensors, AI

== Opportunities and threats ==
In conjunction of the evolution of ubiquitous commerce in daily life and the approaching pervasiveness, a few opportunities as well as threats can be identified.

Opportunities:

- individual advertising and information supply e.g. based on location, time or mood of the customer
- high availability of services
- new potential revenue for supplier and accordingly new business models
- increasing mobility of customers and suppliers

Threats:

- information privacy and threatening of mass surveillance
- increasing requirements due to more diversity and quantity of devices and also energy consumption
- Information overload and likely complexity - also Big Data
- higher vulnerability to spoofing and security holes; e.g. as a result of more targets
- rising exclusion of the elderly based on requirements of higher technical skills
- "desocialization" of customer and supplier

== See also ==
- Ubiquitous computing
- Electronic Business
- Electronic Commerce
- Mobile commerce
- V-commerce
- Machine-to-Machine
