= Intelligent street =

Intelligent street is the name given to a type of intelligent environment which can be found on a public transit street. It has arisen from the convergence of communications and Ubiquitous Computing, intelligent and adaptable user interfaces, and the common infrastructure of the intelligent or mixed pavement.

The Intelligent Street is the basis of the intelligent city and is normally formed of four layers (physical infrastructure, sensors, networks and services), thus improving on the traditional street (which originated in Roman roads or Roman streets) which served solely as transit streets (but did not have any type of “intelligence”).

== Concept ==
The concept of the Intelligent Street is associated with that of the Intelligent Environment, since it is built of/ absorbs all information and communication technologies and sensor systems on any public transit street. This allows the facilities it offers to be integrated into its users’ daily lives for their convenience, but without these users having to make any type of effort or undergo invasions of privacy.

These dual objectives of comfort and simplicity are the basis of the concept of the Intelligent Street, which can be defined as an environment in which users interact in a transparent manner with a multitude of interconnected devices using different types of wireless communication. It is thus possible to construct “intelligent cities”, in the sense indicated by Professor William John Mitchell of the MIT, "Intelligent Cities" (PDF)., by taking advantage of the ‘third wave of technological innovation’ provided by sensors and digital labels, and which will substitute previous waves, relative to the incorporation of computers and the era of connection implied by the introduction of the Internet. As this expert points out, inhabiting intelligent cities implies being continuously connected to different networks, thus allowing these cities to be able to ‘extend’ people's capacities in a more complete and global manner.

The Intelligent Street thus becomes the basis for the Intelligent City, since it permits the creation of interactive spaces which take computing to the physical world, thus supporting a set of interconnected people who, together with their mobile phones, computers and other apparatus, will buy, sell, and exchange information and services.

As has occurred with the television, it seems likely that there will be an “analogical blackout” in cities, and their inhabitants will be able to celebrate this with our new services (as are shown below) via a system of invisible and sustainable infrastructures.

The concept of the Intelligent Street allows the vision of an Information Society in public zones to become a reality, and ensures its ease of use, efficient service support and the possibility of maintaining natural interactions with citizens. Its principal objective is characterized by the fact that it will provide people with intelligent and intuitive interfaces which will be integrated into normal pavements, and that it will be able to recognize and respond to the presence and needs of diverse individuals in a completely discrete and imperceptible manner. Apart from consisting of streets and squares, in which its principal utility resides, the Intelligent Street will also be of great use in schools, transport networks, airports, promenades, theme parks ... and in all those places in which it can assist the pedestrian to find information, relate to others, carry out activities, receive help ... and feel secure.

This concept therefore takes ubiquitous and pervasive computing to public transit streets. Ubiquitous Computing signifies computing that is available everywhere and it is pervasive in the respect that it is integrated, in this case invisibly, into normal pavements.

== Pavement ==
Conventional pavements, be they formed of kerbs, tiles, paving stones, or any other construction material, are intended to be solely and exclusively a decorative element with which to make transit streets or open or enclosed spaces passable. This type of pavement is fundamentally characterized by its colour, form and resistance, and its other useful possibilities (whilst maintaining these characteristics) are not normally considered. The Intelligent Pavement, however, has the peculiarity that its interior contains elements which are not normally associated with pavements (electrical and electronic components, radio frequency components, communication components and components for telephones and the storage of any type of energy), signifying that, in addition to fulfilling its conventional function (a decorative element with which to make transit streets or open or enclosed spaces passable), it also fulfils a secondary function by supporting the infrastructure of the Intelligent Street's services.

All this is possible since, as we know, the advance of technological innovation has led to a reduction in the size of certain objects and elements, both in communications and in other technological sectors, to the extent that tiny electrical, electronic, radiofrequency, communication, sensorial, telephonic and energy storage equipment now exists, which is used with civil or military purposes, and whose casings, casts or boxes are of different forms and textures, and are located in different places.

== Habilitating rlements ==
As occurs with any intelligent environment, "Libro blanco de Telefónica". the Intelligent Street is based on the following technologies and characteristics:

=== Micro-servers ===
The Intelligent Street's mechanisms consist of people, other servers and micro-servers which support software applications that can be used by others, thus creating a distributed and in-built intelligence that is totally invisible to its users. These mechanisms connect with each other, without human intervention, solely through their insertion in the Intelligent Pavement.

=== Terminals and sensors ===
The Intelligent Street supports sensorisation and therefore offers services related to, amongst others, the following:

- Temperature. - Humidity. - Contamination. - Barriers. - Pedestrian Transit Streets. - Wheeled Transit Streets. - Pedestrianisation. - Keys and Switches. - Video-Security.

=== Voluntary identification ===
The machine codes in our mobile phones, or a simple Zigbee bracelet can serve as both pagers and master keys with which to obtain services from the Intelligent Street.

Nevertheless, in the future it might be possible to use identification techniques based on biometric characteristics, or on individual behaviour patterns, so that the service obtained will be personalised.

=== Personalisation of services ===
The services offered by an Intelligent Street of the future will be personalizable, signifying that they will be available, with the appearance desired by each individual, and that it will be possible to add elements depending on the context and circumstances (place, environmental conditions, capacity in terms of the provision of accessible communication networks etc.).

=== Reconfigurability, adaptability and learning ===
The Intelligent Street will be adaptable to space, and will thus be reconfigurable to serve the spatial function that its users may require at any given moment in the best possible manner. User numbers and behaviour are normally modified over time, since a zone might be commercial in one decade and residential the next, or because sensitivity and use necessitate another type of behaviour.

The Intelligent Street can also learn from the people that use it in order to offer them services which are better adapted to their needs.

The fact that a street reconfigures its services and reach implies a reconfiguration of its “intelligence”, thus altering the ‘applications’ that are supported by the micro-servers which are built into the intelligent pavement.

=== Multi-interface access ===
The Intelligent Street provides access to images, sound, voice, text etc. via any standard device and is always adapted to the utmost to the zone used, thus making it unnecessary to use special devices, which may need additional investment and training on the user's behalf if they are to interact with the environment.

== Examples of positive moments ==
The Intelligent Street's specific services can assist in numerous situations: from making a call to the emergency services to requesting information about cultural activities, scholastic control, the generation of statistical data, the selection of restaurants, services for the disabled and even promoting citizens’ security in situations such as those of heavy snowfalls or icy roads.

== Standardisation ==
IEP – Intelligent Environments Pavement ™ is the Intelligent Pavement's first specific standard currently in force in the EU, and therefore supports the installation and maintenance of the Intelligent Street.

The IEP (“The Intelligent Pavement”) standard is a de facto standard created by its manufacturers in order to allow public organisations and administrations to install the Intelligent Pavement in their cities with a total guarantee of service, supply, maintenance and connection to other cities. This standard provides for all the types of elements and organizations that may be interested in the pavement and its associated services.

The IEP standard also allows knowledge and services to be modelled with regard to the technological validity of its developments and installations.

== See also ==
- Smart city
- Intelligent environments
- Internet of Things
- Municipal wireless network
- Wireless sensor network

== Bibliography ==
- Félix Navarro Buitrago Pavimento Inteligente, su integración y usabilidad. Material diverso aportado por el author. 2010.
- Libro Blanco del Hogar Digital y las Infraestructuras Comunes de Telecomunicaciones. Telefónica
- Mitchell, W.J. Intelligent cities. Inaugural Lecture of the UOC 2007-2008 Academic Year. Universitat Oberta de Catalunya. 2007.
