= Dorothy Monekosso =

British computer scientist

Dorothy Ndedi Monekosso
- Education: University of Surrey
- Scientific career
- Fields: Ambient assisted living Intelligent environments Smart homes Assistive robotics
- Workplaces: Aston University; University of Durham; Leeds Beckett University; Bournemouth University; University of Ulster
- Thesis: On-Board reasoning for an autonomous spacecraft (2000)
- Doctoral advisor: Professor Martin Sweeting & Dr. Jeff Ward
- Website: research.aston.ac.uk/en/persons/dorothy-monekosso

Dorothy Ndedi Monekosso is a British academic. She is a professor of computer science in the School of Computer Science and Digital Technologies and Deputy Dean of Research and Enterprise at Aston University. She researches ambient assisted living (AAL), intelligent environments, smart homes, and assistive robotics.

== Education ==
Monekosso studied at the University of Surrey and was awarded a BA in Electrical Engineering and a MSc in Satellite Engineering.

She began her career in space technology research at Surrey Satellite Technology, developing on-board computers and other systems for small satellites and spacecraft. During her PhD at the Surrey Space Centre, she became interested in machine learning, and moved into developing intelligent and robotic systems for security and healthcare applications.

== Career ==
In 2009 Monekosso joined the University of Ulster and later moved to Bournemouth University. In 2015 she started her professorship of computer science at Leeds Beckett University, where she became Director of Research at the School of Built Environment, Engineering and Computing. She was appointed as the Post-graduate Research Lead at Durham University in 2022 and later joined Aston University as the Deputy Dean Research and Enterprise.

== Impact and Awards ==
In March 2020, she was among the 40 black women professors celebrated in the photographic exhibition Phenomenal Women. Also in 2020, Monekosso was awarded an Honorary Fellowship of the British Computer Society for her work on Smart Homes for people living with dementia and for her campaigning work to promote diversity in the tech sector.

== Works ==
- (ed. with Paolo Remagnino and Yoshinori Kuno) Intelligent environments: methods, algorithms and applications. London: Springer, 2008.
- ed. with Paolo Remagnino and Lakhmi C. Jain) Innovations in defence support systems. 3, Intelligent paradigms in security. Berlin: Springer, 2011.
- (with Myo Thida, How-lung Eng and Paolo Remagnino) Contextual analysis of videos. San Rafael, California : Morgan & Claypool, 2013.
