= Virtual engineering =

Virtual engineering (VE) is defined as integrating geometric models and related engineering tools such as analysis, simulation, optimization, and decision making tools, etc., within a computer-generated environment that facilitates multidisciplinary collaborative product development. Virtual engineering shares many characteristics with software engineering, such as the ability to obtain many different results through different implementations.

== Description ==
=== The concept ===
A virtual engineering environment provides a user-centered, first-person perspective that enables users to interact with an engineered system naturally and provides users with a wide range of accessible tools. This requires an engineering model that includes the geometry, physics, and any quantitative or qualitative data from the real system. The user should be able to walk through the operating system and observe how it works and how it responds to changes in design, operation, or any other engineering modification. Interaction within the virtual environment should provide an easily understood interface, appropriate to the user's technical background and expertise, that enables the user to explore and discover unexpected but critical details about the system's behavior. Similarly, engineering tools and software should fit naturally into the environment and allow the user to maintain her or his focus on the engineering problem at hand. A key aim of virtual engineering is to engage the human capacity for complex evaluation.

The key components of such an environment include:

- User-centered virtual reality visualization techniques. When presented in a familiar and natural interface, complex three-dimensional data becomes more understandable and usable, enhancing the user's understanding. Coupled with an appropriate expert (e.g., a design engineer, a plant engineer, or a construction manager), virtual reality can reduce design time for better solutions.
- Computer-aided manufacturing (CAM) Computer-aided manufacturing#cite note-ota-1Interactive analysis and engineering. Today nearly all aspects of power plant simulation require extensive off-line setup, calculation, and iteration. The time required for each iteration can range from one day to several weeks. Tools for interactive collaborative engineering in which the engineer can establish a dynamic thinking process are needed to permit real-time exploration of the “what-if” questions that are essential to the engineering process. In nearly all circumstances, an engineering answer now has much greater value than an answer tomorrow, next week, or next month. Although many excellent engineering analysis techniques have been developed, they are not routinely used as a fundamental part of engineering design, operations, control, and maintenance. The time required to set up, compute, and understand the result, then repeat the process until an adequate answer is obtained, significantly exceeds the time available. This includes techniques such as computational fluid dynamics (CFD), finite elements analysis (FEA), and optimization of complex systems. Instead, these engineering tools are used to provide limited insight to the problem, to sharpen an answer, or to understand what went wrong after a bad design and how to improve the results next time. This is particularly true of CFD analysis.
- Computer-aided engineering (CAE): Integration of real processes into the virtual environment. Engineering is more than analysis and design. A methodology for storage and rapid access to engineering analyses, plant data, geometry, and all other qualitative and quantitative engineering data related to plant operation still needs to be developed.
- Engineering decision support tools. Optimization, cost analysis, scheduling, and knowledge-based tools need to be integrated into the engineering processes.

Virtual engineering allows engineers to work with objects in a virtual space without having to think about the objects' underlying technical information. When an engineer takes hold of a virtual component and moves or alters it, he or she should only have to think about the consequences of such a move in the component's real world counterpart. Engineers must also be able to create a picture of the system, the various parts of the system, and how the parts will interact with each other. When engineers can focus on the making decisions for particular engineering issues rather than the underlying technical information, design cycles and costs are reduced.

== Software ==
- UC-win/Road and VR Studio by FORUM8
- IC.IDO by ESI-Group
- Firefly by EnergyBill — a software platform for real-time geospatial visualization and analysis of utility and infrastructure data. It integrates LiDAR, photogrammetry, and AI-based modeling to support damage assessment, inspection, and planning for electric utilities. Official website • Firefly demonstration video

=== Usual denomination ===
Usually, the modules of virtual engineering are named as such:

- Computer-aided design (CAD): It designate the capability to model a geometry using geometric operations that can be close to real life industrial machining process such as revolution, dressing, extruding. The CAD module is made to ease the generation of a geometrical shape. It comes usually with other modules, such as an engineering drawing making tool.
- Computer-aided manufacturing (CAM): Even if the CAD provide an accurate virtual shape of the objects or parts, the manufacturing of these can be far different, just because the previous tool just dealt with perfect mathematical operation (perfect point, lines, plan, volumes). To take into account in a more realistic manner of the succession of manufacturing operations and to be able to certify that the end product will be close to the virtual model, engineers make use of a manufacturing module which represent a tool that machine the parts.
- Computer-aided engineering (CAE): Another aspect is integrated in a Virtual engineering tool, which is the engineering analysis (finite element analysis of strains, stress, temperature distribution, flow etc.). Such tool can be integrated to the main software or separated. It is usual that the CAE modules software dedicated to that task, having less features in the CAD aspect. Often the tools can perform import/export to make the most of the each tool.

Other modules can exist performing various other tasks, such as prototype manufacturing and product life cycle management.

== See also ==
- V-business
