= Ubiquitous computing =

Concept in software engineering and computer science

Ubiquitous computing (or "ubicomp") is a concept in software engineering, hardware engineering and computer science where computing is made to appear seamlessly anytime and everywhere. In contrast to desktop computing, ubiquitous computing implies use on any device, in any location, and in any format. A user interacts with the computer, which can exist in many different forms, including laptop computers, tablets, smart phones and terminals in everyday objects such as a refrigerator or a pair of glasses. The underlying technologies to support ubiquitous computing include the Internet, advanced middleware, kernels, operating systems, mobile codes, sensors, microprocessors, new I/Os and user interfaces, computer networks, mobile protocols, global navigational systems, and new materials.

This paradigm is also described as pervasive computing, ambient intelligence, or "everyware". Each term emphasizes slightly different aspects. When primarily concerning the objects involved, it is also known as physical computing, the Internet of Things, haptic computing, and "things that think". Rather than propose a single definition for ubiquitous computing and for these related terms, a taxonomy of properties for ubiquitous computing has been proposed, from which different kinds or flavors of ubiquitous systems and applications can be described.

Ubiquitous computing themes include: distributed computing, mobile computing, location computing, mobile networking, sensor networks, human–computer interaction, context-aware smart home technologies, and artificial intelligence.

== Core concepts ==
Ubiquitous computing is the concept of using small internet connected and inexpensive computers to help with everyday functions in an automated fashion.

Mark Weiser proposed three basic forms for ubiquitous computing devices:

- Tabs: a wearable device that is approximately a centimeter in size
- Pads: a hand-held device that is approximately a decimeter in size
- Boards: an interactive larger display device that is approximately a meter in size

Ubiquitous computing devices proposed by Mark Weiser are all based around flat devices of different sizes with a visual display. These conceptual device categories were later implemented at Xerox PARC in experimental systems including the PARCTab, PARCPad, and LiveBoard, which served as early prototypes of handheld, tablet-style, and large interactive display computing environments. Expanding beyond those concepts there is a large array of other ubiquitous computing devices that could exist.

== History ==
Mark Weiser coined the phrase "ubiquitous computing" around 1988, during his tenure as Chief Technologist of the Xerox Palo Alto Research Center (PARC). Both alone and with PARC Director and Chief Scientist John Seely Brown, Weiser wrote some of the earliest papers on the subject, largely defining it and sketching out its major concerns.

== Recognizing the effects of extending processing power ==
Recognizing that the extension of processing power into everyday scenarios would necessitate understandings of social, cultural and psychological phenomena beyond its proper ambit, Weiser was influenced by many fields outside computer science, including "philosophy, phenomenology, anthropology, psychology, post-Modernism, sociology of science and feminist criticism". He was explicit about "the humanistic origins of the 'invisible ideal in post-modernist thought'", referencing as well the ironically dystopian Philip K. Dick novel Ubik.

Andy Hopper from Cambridge University UK proposed and demonstrated the concept of "Teleporting" – where applications follow the user wherever he/she moves.

Roy Want (now at Google), while at Olivetti Research Ltd, designed the first "Active Badge System", which is an advanced location computing system where personal mobility is merged with computing. Later at Xerox PARC, he designed and built the "PARCTab" or simply "Tab", widely recognized as the world's first Context-Aware computer, which has great similarity to the modern smartphone.

Bill Schilit (now at Google) also did some earlier work in this topic, and participated in the early Mobile Computing workshop held in Santa Cruz in 1996.

Ken Sakamura of the University of Tokyo, Japan leads the Ubiquitous Networking Laboratory (UNL), Tokyo as well as the T-Engine Forum. The joint goal of Sakamura's Ubiquitous Networking specification and the T-Engine forum, is to enable any everyday device to broadcast and receive information.

MIT has also contributed significant research in this field, notably Things That Think consortium (directed by Hiroshi Ishii, Joseph A. Paradiso and Rosalind Picard) at the Media Lab and the CSAIL effort known as Project Oxygen. Other major contributors include University of Washington (Shwetak Patel, Anind Dey and James Landay), Dartmouth College's HealthX Lab (directed by Andrew Campbell), Georgia Tech's College of Computing (Gregory Abowd and Thad Starner), Cornell Tech's People Aware Computing Lab (directed by Tanzeem Choudhury), NYU's Interactive Telecommunications Program, UC Irvine's Department of Informatics, Microsoft Research, Intel Research and Equator, Ajou University UCRi & CUS.

== Examples ==
One of the earliest ubiquitous systems was artist Natalie Jeremijenko's "Live Wire", also known as "Dangling String", installed at Xerox PARC during Mark Weiser's time there. This was a piece of string attached to a stepper motor and controlled by a LAN connection; network activity caused the string to twitch, yielding a peripherally noticeable indication of traffic. Weiser called this an example of calm technology.

A present manifestation of this trend is the widespread diffusion of mobile phones. Many mobile phones support high speed data transmission, video services, and other services with powerful computational ability. Although these mobile devices are not necessarily manifestations of ubiquitous computing, there are examples, such as Japan's Yaoyorozu ("Eight Million Gods") Project in which mobile devices, coupled with radio frequency identification tags demonstrate that ubiquitous computing is already present in some form.

Ambient Devices has produced an "orb", a "dashboard", and a "weather beacon": these decorative devices receive data from a wireless network and report current events, such as stock prices and the weather, like the Nabaztag, which was invented by Rafi Haladjian and Olivier Mével, and manufactured by the company Violet.

The Australian futurist Mark Pesce has produced a highly configurable 52-LED LAMP enabled lamp which uses Wi-Fi named MooresCloud after Gordon Moore.

The Unified Computer Intelligence Corporation launched a device called Ubi – The Ubiquitous Computer designed to allow voice interaction with the home and provide constant access to information.

Ubiquitous computing research has focused on building an environment in which computers allow humans to focus attention on select aspects of the environment and operate in supervisory and policy-making roles. Ubiquitous computing emphasizes the creation of a human computer interface that can interpret and support a user's intentions. For example, MIT's Project Oxygen seeks to create a system in which computation is as pervasive as air:

In the future, computation will be human centered. It will be freely available everywhere, like batteries and power sockets, or oxygen in the air we breathe...We will not need to carry our own devices around with us. Instead, configurable generic devices, either handheld or embedded in the environment, will bring computation to us, whenever we need it and wherever we might be. As we interact with these "anonymous" devices, they will adopt our information personalities. They will respect our desires for privacy and security. We won't have to type, click, or learn new computer jargon. Instead, we'll communicate naturally, using speech and gestures that describe our intent...

This is a fundamental transition that does not seek to escape the physical world and "enter some metallic, gigabyte-infested cyberspace" but rather brings computers and communications to us, making them "synonymous with the useful tasks they perform".

Network robots link ubiquitous networks with robots, contributing to the creation of new lifestyles and solutions to address a variety of social problems including the aging of population and nursing care.

The "Continuity" set of features, introduced by Apple in OS X Yosemite, can be seen as an example of ubiquitous computing.

== Issues ==
Privacy is easily the most often-cited criticism of ubiquitous computing (ubicomp), and may be the greatest barrier to its long-term success.

== Research centres ==
India

Ubiquitous Computing Research Resource Centre (UCRC), Centre for Development of Advanced Computing

== See also ==
- Ambient IoT
- Ambient media
- Computer accessibility
- Human-centered computing
- Mobile interaction
- Smart city (ubiquitous city)
- Ubiquitous commerce
- Ubiquitous learning
- Ubiquitous robot
- Wearable computer
