= Roy Want =

British-American computer scientist

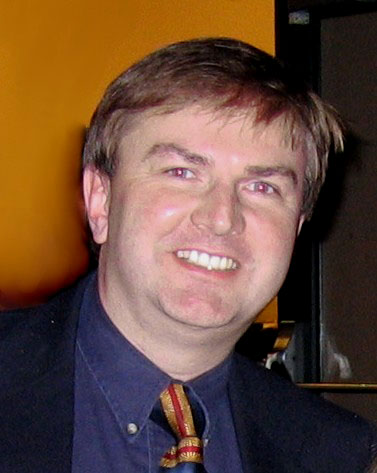
- Born: London, United Kingdom
- Citizenship: American (USA)
- Education: Churchill College, Cambridge
- Alma mater: Cambridge University, UK
- Known for: Indoor Positioning, Mobile Computing, and Automatic Identification
- Awards: ACM SIGMOBILE Outstanding Contributions Award (OCA) 2019, IEEE Fellow, ACM Fellow
- Scientific career
- Fields: Computer Science
- Workplaces: Google, Intel, Xerox PARC
- Thesis: The Reliable Management of Voice in a Distributed System
- Doctoral advisor: Prof. Roger M. Needham
- Website: https://sites.google.com/view/roywant

Roy Want is a computer scientist born in London, United Kingdom in 1961. He received his PhD from Cambridge University (UK) in 1988 for his work on multimedia Distributed Systems; and is known for his work on indoor positioning, mobile and ubiquitous computing, automatic identification (e.g. RFID and wireless beacons) and the Internet of Things (IoT). He lives in Silicon Valley, California, and has authored or co-authored over 150 papers and articles on mobile systems, and holds 100+ patents. In 2011 he joined Google and is currently a Principal Scientist in the Android group. Previous roles include Senior Principal Engineer at Intel, and Principal Scientist at Xerox PARC...

== Projects ==
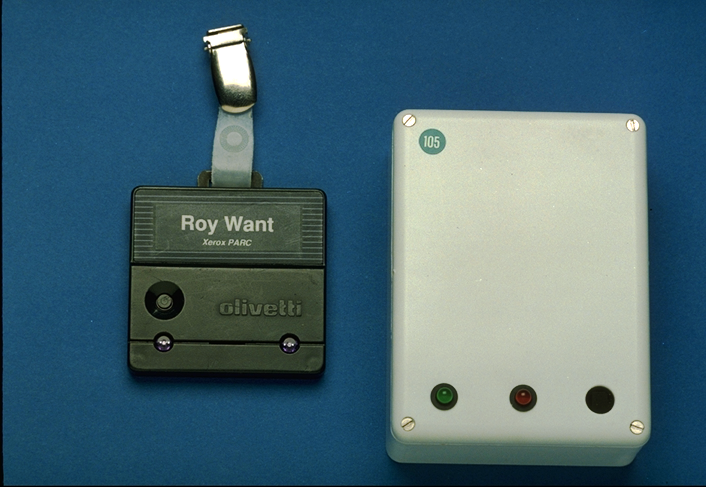
Active Badge system components

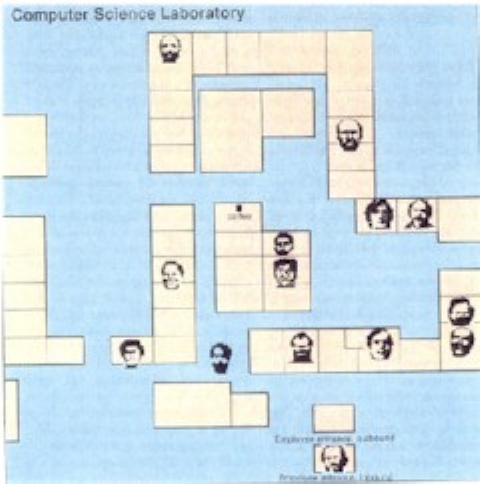
Location map of Active Badge participants

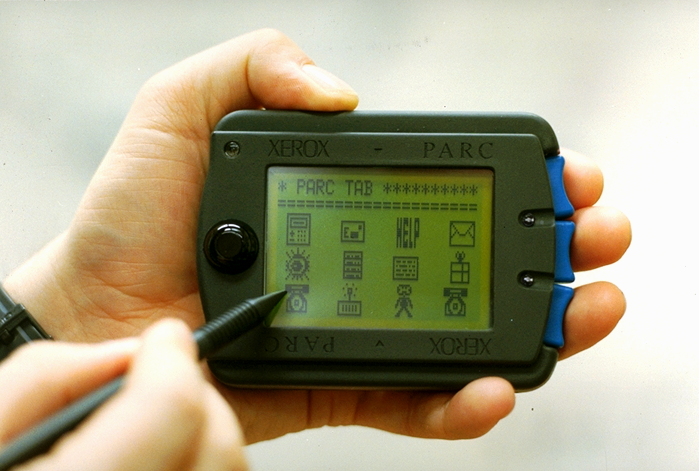
PARC-Tab (the first context-aware mobile computer) being used with a stylus

Among his earliest contributions (circa 1988) was the Active Badge system that identified individual mobile users, and their location, to the computing infrastructure inside a building. This pioneering work was done at the Olivetti Research Ltd (ORL) in Cambridge, United Kingdom and its seminal publication has been recognized with the ACM SIGMOBILE Test-of-Time Award (2016). Over 1000 Active Badges were deployed outside Olivetti, at laboratories including DEC SRC, and Xerox PARC. These deployments sparked the creation of the first generation of context-aware software systems in the larger research community.

Want was a central figure in the earliest realization (at Xerox PARC) of Mark Weiser’s vision of Ubiquitous Computing. The PARC program involved three devices: PARC-Tab, PARC-Pad, and LiveBoard. Today, these form-factors map directly to smartphones, tablets and smart-TVs. In the early 1990s, Want was the principal architect and implementer of PARC-Tab, the world’s first context-aware mobile computer in a smartphone form-factor. It could adapt the behavior of applications, depending on the user’s context, a decade before the emergence of the iPhone (2007). A key technology that made the PARC-Tab context-aware was the use of an infrared network, both connecting the device to the local area network, and localizing it to a room using a diffuse infrared-network transceiver.

In the late 1990’s at PARC, Want also pioneered extending the classic notion of a mobile UI to incorporate inertial sensors, taking advantage of the new MEMS technologies, and designed the Hikari handheld digital organizer. It would automatically change from portrait to landscape format as you rotated it; now a commonplace capability for smartphones. Lists could also be scrolled and items selected using a tilt and clutch mechanism, and photos selected from a 2D grid using a ball-in-a-maze puzzle style of user interface.

By the end of 1990s, Want led PARC’s electronic tag project, “Bridging Physical and Digital worlds”, based on passive RFID. It was the first comprehensive published vision that electronic tags (inexpensive, and battery-free), could link the then new mobile platforms with a location, and related digital web content/control; another example of context-aware computing

Want continued to make pioneering contributions to mobile computing over the following two decades. At Intel Research, he led the Personal Server project (2001), a platform later integrated into an early smartphone, which enabled users to present their personal digital content and media onto nearby displays. This led to his vision of Dynamic Composable Computing (2005), in which a mobile user is able to rapidly assemble a logical computer on-the-fly through wireless-connected components. Today, the Personal Server concept is embodied in Apple’s Airplay and Google Cast media services, and as a result the original paper was given the 10-year impact-award at ACM Ubicomp ’12

At Google, Want was one of the leads for the Eddystone Bluetooth-Low-Energy (BLE) beacon project, with similar context-aware goals to RFID, but enhanced by ubiquitous readers in the form of smartphones, which can detect BLE advertisement IDs at much greater range, and now supported commercially by many vendors.

== Technical Service ==
In addition to his technical contributions, Want has been a dedicated member of the ACM SIGMOBILE community and made many leadership and service contributions. He was the Chair of SIGMOBILE from 2009-12, and has served as program chair for top tier conferences such as ACM MobiSys, ACM HotMobile, IEEE PerDis, IEEE ISWC; and in the role as Editor-in-Chief for IEEE Pervasive Computing magazine (2006-09) [26-32] and provided Editorial Board contributions to IEEE Computer magazine.

In 2019 he became the Technical Editor for the IEEE 802.11az Wi-Fi standard, working on the Next-Generation Positioning standard, and later IEEE 802.11bk (320MHz Positioning), and leading the integration of 802.11mc and the next generation technologies into Android P+ to enable enhanced context-aware operation for more than 3.3 billion devices. The initial technology and API was presented publicly at Google IO ’18, and is expected to lead to ubiquitous (1-2m) indoor location accuracy as the world upgrades its Wi-Fi infrastructure to the latest standards.

== Awards ==
Want is an ACM Fellow (2005) and IEEE Fellow (2005). In 2003 he also received the Lillian Gilbreth Lectureship award from the US National Academy of Engineering (NAE) for his work on the Intel Personal Server; The Gilbreth Lectures were established in 2001 by the Council of the National Academy of Engineering as a means of recognizing outstanding young American engineers. Later in 2019 he received the Outstanding Contributions Award (OCA) for “For hardware and software contributions to the conception and practice of context-aware mobile computing” (2019), the most prestigious award presented by ACM SIGMOBILE.
