= Simon Birrell =

British entrepreneur, technologist and film maker (born 1966)

- Born: Simon Birrell; 26 July 1966 (age 60); Bristol, England
- Education: Cambridge University
- Occupations: Entrepreneur, technologist, film maker
- Known for: Ambient intelligence

Simon Birrell (born 26 July 1966) is a British entrepreneur, technologist and film maker. He was part of the team that invented ambient intelligence and who, with Eli Zelkha, coined the term.

== Biography ==
=== Early life, education and career ===
Born in 1966 in Bristol, UK. He graduated from Cambridge University in 1988 with a degree in Natural Sciences.

He has been a founder or co-founder of three companies. Euro-Profile/i-Profile – a business intelligence company based out of Silicon Valley which was acquired by Virgo Capital (2008), Vemm Brazil, a publisher of consumer advice websites in Brazil which was acquired by QuinStreet (2015) and Silicon Artists, a Madrid-based entertainment technology company funded by Silicon Valley–based Tandem Computers.

=== Ambient intelligence ===
In 1998, Birrell was part of the team at Palo Alto Ventures that invented and developed the ambient intelligence concept and who, with Eli Zelkha, coined the term. It was presented by Roel Pieper of Philips at The Digital Living Room Conference on 22 June 1998.

Since its invention in 1998, Ambient Intelligence labs have been formed at leading universities and ambient intelligence has become part of the core strategies of many of the world's leading technology companies, including Microsoft, Google, Amazon and IBM.

=== Robotics and deep learning ===
Birrell is researching deep learning and robotics at Cambridge University. He is the author of the blog Artificial Human Companions.

=== Video games, virtual reality and other activities ===
He developed some of the first video games for Richard Branson's Virgin Interactive in 1983. These included Bug Bomb – BBC Micro (1983), Microbe – BBC Micro (1983), High-Rise Horror – BBC Micro and Commodore 64 (1984), Strangeloop – Commodore 64 (1985), Shogun – Commodore 64 / Amstrad (co-design).

From 1993 to 1995, Birrell was the CTO of an early virtual reality company in Spain called Realidad Virtual S.L. At Realidad Virtual, he developed Pandora – the first Spanish online virtual reality platform for the Internet.

Mundo de Estrellas (1998) was a distributed virtual reality environment for hospitalised children in Andalucia created by his company Silicon Artists.

He is also a film maker and writer. As a film maker, he has directed two shorts and collaborated with cult filmmakers Jess Franco and Jose Ramon Larraz.

Birrell authored a chapter in an MIT book on Information Design and co-authored a book on videogames.
