= Mir:ror =

Mir:ror is a personal RFID reader that connects to a personal computer via a USB port. It was presented at the Internationale Funkausstellung Berlin in September 2008 and is produced by Violet, which also produces the Nabaztag. It is designed to work with Violet-produced RFID tags (Ztamps) which are industry standard ISO/IEC 14443 type A or B. When a tagged object is moved near the RFID reader, the reader will prompt the computer to do something, such as opening a related website.

== Award ==
Mir:ror was awarded a Star at the Design Observeur 2009.

== See also ==
- Touchatag
