= Nabaztag =

Ambient electronic device

Nabaztag/tag
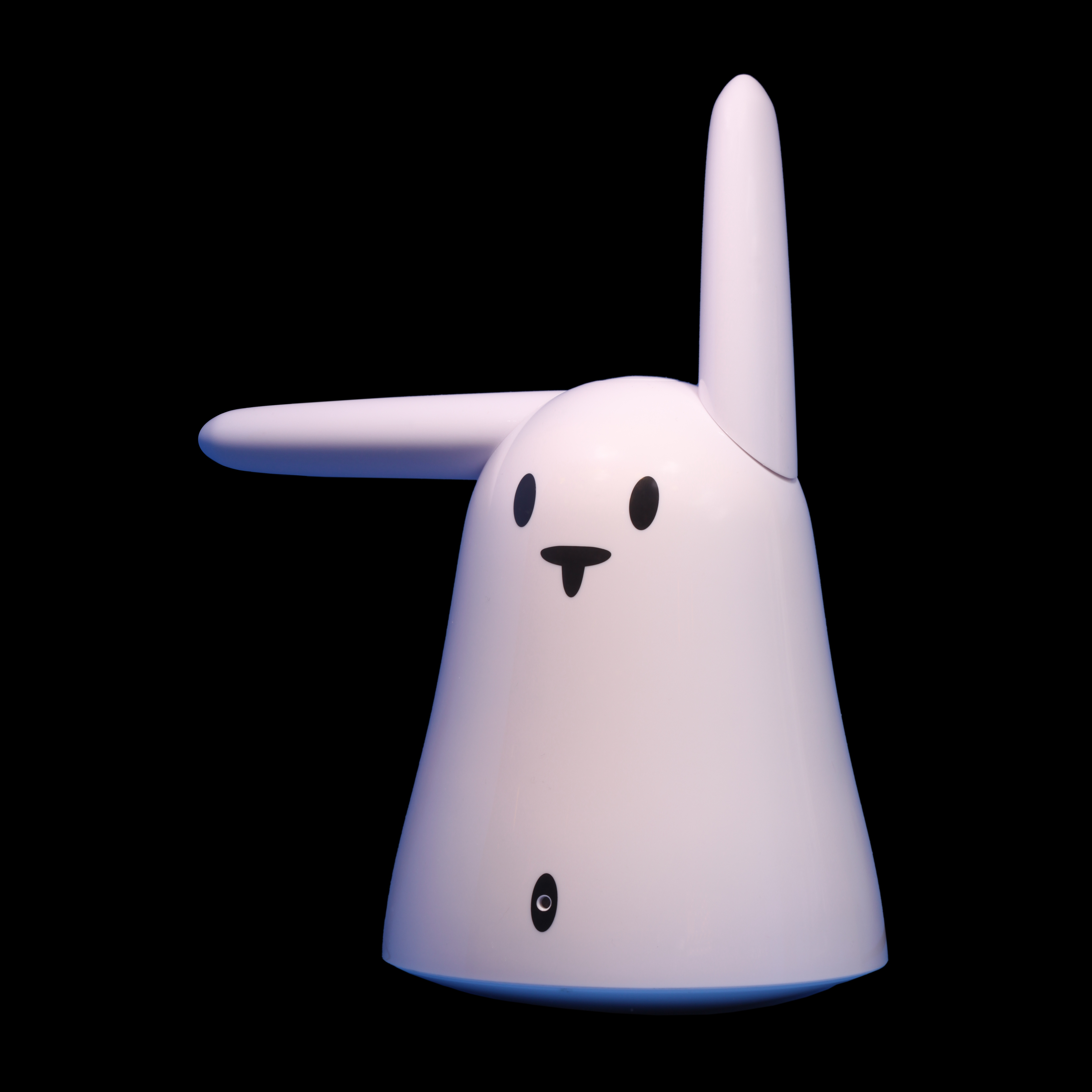
- Nabaztag
- Developer: Violet
- Type: Information console Portable media player (PMP)
- CPU: PIC18F6525
- Online services: weather forecast stock market report news headlines alarm clock e-mail alerts RSS-Feeds; MP3-Streams

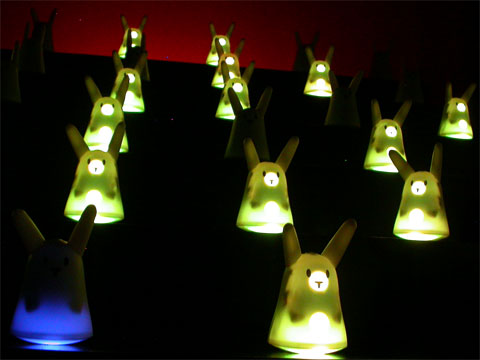
The 100 Rabbit Opera at the 2006 NextFest in New York

Nabaztag (Armenian for "hare", նապաստակ (napastak)) is a Wi-Fi enabled ambient electronic device in the shape of a rabbit, invented by Rafi Haladjian and Olivier Mével, and manufactured by the company Violet. Nabaztag was designed to be a "smart object" comparable to those manufactured by Ambient Devices; it can connect to the Internet (to download weather forecasts, read its owner's email, etc.). It is also customizable and programmable to an extent. Sylvain Huet developed most of the embedded code of all Violet objects. Sebastien Bourdeauducq developed the Wi-Fi driver. Antoine Schmitt has been their behavior designer and Jean-Jacques Birgé their sound designer (together they have also composed Nabaz'mob, an opera for 100 Nabaztag). Maÿlis Puyfaucher (who features its French voice) wrote all the original texts pronounced by the rabbit.

On 20 October 2009, following a long period of technical difficulties that ultimately led to Violet's bankruptcy, Mindscape purchased Violet.

In October 2010, Mindscape announced a third generation Nabaztag, called "Karotz". Karotz was released April 2012.

On 27 July 2011, Mindscape stopped the maintenance of the Nabaztag and released its source code.

On 23 December 2011, it was announced that the Nabaztag rabbits would be "coming back to life" on 24 December 2011 at midnight via email to those with Violet accounts. The required server service at Nabaztag.com has since stopped functioning, but other options exist including setting up a server using OpenNab software or installing NabaztagLives on a Raspberry Pi single-board computer.

== Features ==
Out of the box, the Nabaztag rabbit is 23 cm (9 in) in height and weighs 418 g (14.7 oz). It can send and receive MP3s and messages that are read out loud as well as perform the following services (by either speaking the information out loud or using indicative lights): weather forecast, stock market report, news headlines, alarm clock, e-mail alerts, RSS-Feeds, MP3-Streams and others.

There is an API, with bindings for multiple programming languages including Java, Perl, Python, or PHP, available to program the Nabaztag.

At first speaking only in English and French, as of June 2007, Nabaztag fully supports services in German, Italian, Spanish and Dutch.

The rabbits can be customized with Skinz tattoos, detachable USB tails in various colors, and many interchangeable ears with different designs and colors. The Nabaztag:tag and Karotz versions are capable of reading RFID chips, and products containing RFID chips include the Flatanoz key ring tags, miniature models of the rabbits called Nano:ztag, and some children's books. Individual RFID chips were also produced and were called ztamp:s.

== Community ==
Nabaztag owners can join social networks to share photos and videos on websites like Flickr and YouTube. Users can create podcasts (dubbed "Nabcasts" by Violet). There are currently over 100 of these available, mostly in English and French, created by different users on a variety of topics.

Since Nabaztags can be programmed to provide new services using the API, there are user-created applications available, including a Dashboard widget and a lottery alarm.

== Infrastructure shortcomings ==
In December 2006 (most notably around Christmas) a number of sold rabbits caused issues for Violet, the maker of Nabaztag. The Nabaztag device acts as a client to the France-based servers. When users attempted to register their new devices, the centralized servers were unable to handle the demand, resulting in service disruptions, server unavailability, and data integrity problems caused by users creating multiple half-finished registrations. This resulted in a major customer service problem for Violet. The fundamental philosophy of Nabaztag, that all objects should be connected together on the Internet by a server maintained by Violet did not work as expected (e.g. the server sometimes could not cope with volume of traffic, services had to be switched off and there were unreliable response times often as slow as hours rather than seconds).

In March 2008, Violet changed their server infrastructure and bunny software to use the standard XMPP protocol. Bunnies were thereafter reacting much more rapidly on average, although long delays still occurred sometimes. The change caused service disruptions and problems for a couple of weeks.

== Technical specifications ==
The device embeds a PIC18F6525 microcontroller, a BenQ PC card 802.11b Wi-Fi adapter, an ml2870a Audio-PCM sound generator, an ADPCM converter, two motors to activate the ears, a TLC5922 LED controller, and a small amount of memory.

The embedded software handles the TCP/IP stack and Wi-Fi driver. It also implements a virtual machine which is able to execute up to 64 kb of code. A dedicated assembly language exists to program the different features of the device.

== Nabaztag/tag ==
Out on market on 12 December 2006, Nabaztag/tag is an improved model of Violet's Nabaztag. The new model supports MP3 audio streaming for Internet radio (with preset radio stations and an app allowing to add your own stream that does not work) and podcasts. This second version Nabaztag has also added a microphone that allows for voice activation of some of its services. However, despite text on the website claiming that new services will be available soon, the number of working voice activated services remains less than a handful. A final added feature is a built-in RFID reader to detect special-purpose RFID tags (i.e. ISO/IEC 14443 Type B). Nabaztag advertisement is presenting the ability to identify objects (depicted are e.g. keys).

Nabaztag/tag can, as of November 2007, use RFID tags to read special edition versions of children's books by the French publisher Gallimard Jeunesse. In October 2008, Violet launched RFID Children's Books with Penguin Publishing House. Further RFID services and support have been promised. Violet has now started selling the Zstamps and Nano:ztags (little mini Rabbits with Zstamps inside them) and another called mir:ror which is its own RFID system separate from the Nabaztag.

The Wi-Fi was also upgraded to support WPA encryption, and now uses a cheaper SoftMAC card instead of the BenQ device which embedded its own 802.11 protocol stack.

== Cessation of service ==
Mindscape, filing for bankruptcy, discontinued the Nabaztag/tag web service in late July 2011.

== Karotz ==
Karotz is the third generation Nabaztag, and first to be released since the Mindscape purchase. Like its predecessors, Karotz connects to the Internet using Wi-Fi and has RFID reading capability. Additionally, it includes an integrated web cam, a USB port (which can be used for power as well as connectivity), and 256 MB of onboard storage. Karotz was released in April 2011 and is heavily integrated with Facebook and Twitter.

In October 2011 Mindscape was taken over by Aldebaran Robotics quoting "Together we shall go on with this wonderful adventure".

In October 2014 Aldebaran Robotics announce "The end of Karotz's adventures" with "nearly 10 years after its first appearance, Karotz is facing a very strong technological competition: the connected devices are now 4G, mobile and evolutionary. Karotz and its users have not only helped establish connected devices; they have paved the way. New products make a stronger match to market needs, marking the end of Karotz's great story."

"Karotz's servers and customer service will be stopped on February 18th, 2015"

== Karotz private servers ==
In 2016, two years after "The end of Karotz's adventures" a new English enabled API has been set up to bring Karotz out of retirement from a volunteer initiative called Free Rabbits!

== Security ==
During DEF CON 21, Daniel Crowley, Jennifer Savage and David Bryan pointed out several security vulnerabilities about the Karotz. Unsecured connections to the website's provider could allow a hacker to steal the users' Wi-Fi passwords, take control of the Karotz, installing malware and even to corrupt the device without any knowledge of the end user. During the same talk, they also show how it was possible to spy around the Karotz due to the presence of the camera and the microphone embedded in the bunny.

== Awards ==
Violet was awarded honourable mentions, category Small companies of the DME Award 2007 for Nabaztag.

Nabaztag/tag was awarded for Netxplorateur of the Year in 2008.

Nabaz'mob was awarded by Prix Ars Electronica Digital Musics 2009 (Award of Distinction).

== See also ==
- Internet of Things
- Ubiquitous computing
- Digital pet
