= Eli Zelkha =

American entrepreneur, venture capitalist and professor

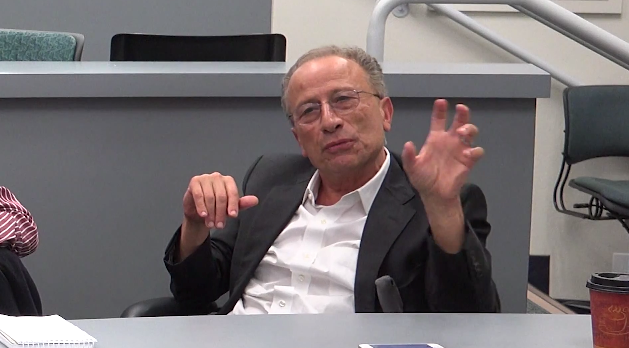
- Zelkha at a panel discussion on Ambient Intelligence
- Born: Elias Zelkha; May 4, 1950; Tehran, Iran
- Died: January 8, 2017 (aged 66); Woodside, California, U.S.
- Education: Colgate University, Stanford University
- Occupations: Entrepreneur, venture capitalist, professor
- Known for: Ambient intelligence

Elias "Eli" Zelkha (May 4, 1950 – January 8, 2017) was an Iranian-American entrepreneur, venture capitalist and professor. He was the inventor of ambient intelligence.

He died on January 8, 2017, in Woodside, California, at the age of 66.

== Biography ==
=== Early life, education and career ===
Born in 1950 in Tehran, Iran to a Jewish family – Zelkha immigrated to the U.S in 1967. He graduated from Colgate University with a degree in international relations and from The Stanford University Graduate School of Business.

He was a founder or co-founder of five companies: Kandahar Designs, Palo Alto Ventures, Livewall, Euro-Profile/i-Profile, Vemm Brazil.

He was at Tandem Computers where he led strategy and new ventures, including a partnership with Steven Spielberg's Starbright Foundation.

=== Ambient intelligence ===
In 1998, Eli led the team of Simon Birrell, Clark Dodsworth, Doug Randall and Brian Epstein that invented and developed the ambient intelligence concept and who, with Simon Birrell, coined the term. It was presented by Roel Pieper of Philips at The Digital Living Room Conference on June 22, 1998.

Since its invention in 1998, ambient intelligence has become part of the core strategies of many of the world's leading technology companies, including Microsoft, Google, Amazon and IBM.

=== Seminars and teaching ===
At the Middlebury Institute of International Studies he taught entrepreneurship, venture capital and strategy.

The Art of Failure and Corporate and International Venture Capital. He was also a lecturer on Scenario Planning And Uncertainty at the Stanford University School of Engineering.
