= Cyborg anthropology =

Study of humanity and technology

Cyborg anthropology is a discipline that studies the interaction between humanity and technology from an anthropological perspective. The discipline offers novel insights on new technological advances and their effect on culture and society.

== History ==
Donna Haraway’s 1984 "A Cyborg Manifesto" was the first widely-read academic text to explore the philosophical and sociological ramifications of the cyborg. A sub-focus group within the American Anthropological Association's annual meeting in 1992 presented a paper entitled "Cyborg Anthropology", which cites Haraway's "Manifesto". The group described cyborg anthropology as the study of how humans define humanness in relationship to machines, as well as the study of science and technology as activities that can shape and be shaped by culture. This includes studying the ways that all people, including those who are not scientific experts, talk about and conceptualize technology. The sub-group was closely related to STS and the Society for the Social Studies of Science. More recently, Amber Case has been responsible for explicating the concept of Cyborg Anthropology to the general public. She believes that a key aspect of cyborg anthropology is the study of networks of information among humans and technology.

Many academics have helped develop cyborg anthropology, and many more who haven't heard the term still are today conducting research that may be considered cyborg anthropology, particularly research regarding technologically advanced prosthetics and how they can influence an individual's life. A 2014 summary of holistic American anthropology's intersections with cyborg concepts (whether explicit or not) by Joshua Wells explained how the information-rich and culture-laden ways in which humans imagine, construct, and use tools may extend the cyborg concept through the human evolutionary lineage. Amber Case generally tells people that the actual number of self-described cyborg anthropologists is "about seven". The Cyborg Anthropology Wiki, overseen by Case, aims to make the discipline as accessible as possible, even to people who do not have a background in anthropology.

== Methodology ==
Cyborg anthropology uses traditional methods of anthropological research like ethnography and participant observation, accompanied by statistics, historical research, and interviews. By nature it is a multidisciplinary study; cyborg anthropology can include aspects of science and technology Studies, cybernetics, feminist theory, and more. It primarily focuses on how people use discourse about science and technology in order to make these meaningful in their lives.

=== 'Cyborg' origins and meaning ===
The word cyborg was originally coined in a 1960 paper about space exploration, the term is short for cybernetic organism. A cyborg is traditionally defined as a system with both organic and inorganic parts. In the narrowest sense of the word, cyborgs are people with machinated body parts. These cyborg parts may be restorative technologies that help a body function where the organic system has failed, like pacemakers, insulin pumps, and bionic limbs, or enhanced technologies that improve the human body beyond its natural state. In the broadest sense, all human interactions with technology could qualify as a cyborg. Most cyborg anthropologists lean towards the latter view of the cyborg; some, like Amber Case, even claim that humans are already cyborgs because people's daily life and sense of self is so intertwined with technology. Haraway's "Cyborg Manifesto" suggests that technology like virtual avatars, artificial insemination, sexual reassignment surgery, and artificial intelligence might make dichotomies of sex and gender irrelevant, even nonexistent. She goes on to say that other human distinctions (like life and death, human and machine, virtual and real) may similarly disappear in the wake of the cyborg.

=== Digital vs. cyborg anthropology ===
Digital anthropology is concerned with how digital advances are changing how people live their lives, as well as consequent changes to how anthropologists do ethnography and to a lesser extent how digital technology can be used to represent and undertake research. Cyborg anthropology also looks at disciplines like genetics and nanotechnology, which are not strictly digital. Cybernetics/informatics covers the range of cyborg advances better than the label digital.

== Key concepts and research ==
=== Actor–network theory ===
Questions of subjectivity, agency, actors, and structures have always been of interest in social and cultural anthropology. In cyborg anthropology the question of what type of cybernetic system constitutes an actor/subject becomes all the more important. Is it the actual technology that acts on humanity (the Internet), the general techno-culture (Silicon Valley), government sanctions (net neutrality), specific innovative humans (Steve Jobs), or some type of combination of these elements? Some academics believe that only humans have agency and technology is an object humans act upon, while others argue that humans have no agency and culture is entirely shaped by material and technological conditions. Actor-network theory (ANT), proposed by Bruno Latour, is a theory that helps scholars understand how these elements work together to shape techno-cultural phenomena. Latour suggests that actors and the subjects they act on are parts of larger networks of mutual interaction and feedback loops. Humans and technology both have the agency to shape one another. ANT best describes the way cyborg anthropology approaches the relationship between humans and technology. Similarly, Wells explain how new forms of networked political expression such as the Pirate Party movement and free and open-source software philosophies are generated from human reliance on information technologies in all walks of life.

=== Artificial intelligence ===
The popular advent of artificial intelligence has created new opportunities for the analytical and theoretical strengths of cyborg anthropology. Researchers like Kathleen Richardson have conducted ethnographic research on the humans who build and interact with artificial intelligence. A 2026 article by Wells and VanderVeen used frameworks of cyborg anthropology to explore how artificial intelligence impacts arenas of sociocultural action such as workplaces, civic organizations, domestic settings, and educational institutions; the authors state, "Informed by Haraway’s emphases on inequalities, we recognize AI is neither a separate nor superior form of intelligence, but a tool that augments human agency," and from there explain how that understanding should be used to inform practical and ethical considerations for the ongoing development and implementation of AI.

Recently, Stuart Geiger, a PhD student at University of California, Berkeley suggested that robots may be capable of creating a culture of their own, which researchers could study with ethnographic methods. Anthropologists react to Geiger with skepticism because, according to Geiger, they believe that culture is specific to living creatures and ethnography limited to human subjects.

=== Posthumanism ===
The most basic definition of anthropology is the study of humans. However, cyborgs, by definition, describe something that is not entirely an organic human. Moreover, limiting a discipline to the study of humans may be difficult the more that technology allows humans to transcend the normal conditions of organic life. The prospect of a posthuman condition calls into question the nature and necessity of a field focused on studying humans.

Sociologist of technology Zeynep Tufekci argues that any symbolic expression of ourselves, even the most ancient cave painting, can be considered "posthuman" because it exists outside of our physical bodies. To her, this means that the human and the "posthuman" have always existed alongside one another, and anthropology has always concerned itself with the posthuman as well as the human. Neil L. Whitehead and Michael Welsch point out that the concern that posthumanism will decenter the human in anthropology ignores the discipline's long history of engaging with the unhuman (like spirits and demons that humans believe in) and the culturally "subhuman" (like marginalized groups within a society). Contrarily, Wells, taking a deep-time perspective, points out the ways that tool-centric and technologically communicated values and ethics typify the human condition, and that cross-cultural and ethnological trends in conceptions of lifeways, power dynamics, and definitions of humanity often incorporate information-rich technological symbology.

== Notable figures ==
- Donna Haraway
- Manfred E. Clynes
- Nathan S. Kline
- Amber Case
- Sherry Turkle
- Sharon Traweek
- Lucien Castaing-Taylor
- Allucquere Rosanne Stone
- Dada

== See also ==
- Transhumanism
- Robotics
- Posthumanization
- Digital humanities
