= Amber Case =

Cyborg anthropologist (born 1986)

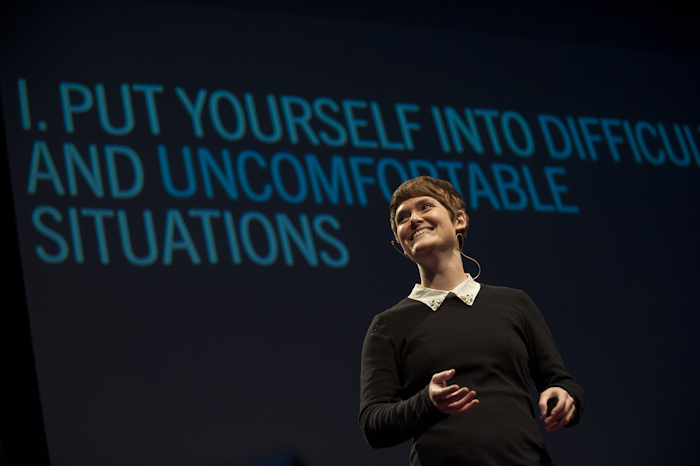
Case in 2013

Amber Case (born 1986) is an American cyborg anthropologist, user experience designer and public speaker. She studies the interaction between humans and technology.

== Biography ==
Case was born around 1986 in Portland, Oregon. She graduated with a bachelor's degree in sociology from Lewis & Clark College in 2008, her undergraduate thesis analyzed the social consequences of the newly-released iPhone. In 2008, she co-founded CyborgCamp, an unconference on the future of humans and computers.

Case was named a National Geographic Emerging Explorer in 2012, and gave a 2010 TED talk called “We Are All Cyborgs Now”

In 2010, Case and Aaron Parecki founded Geoloqi, a location-based software company. The company was acquired by Esri in 2012. In 2015, Case left Esri to work for a new company called Healthways where she became the managing director.

In her work, Case often declares that we are all cyborgs already, as a cyborg is simply a human who interacts with technology. According to Case the technology doesn't necessarily need to be implanted: it can be a physical or mental extension. She argues that these days we now have two selves: one digital, one physical.

Case's main focus in recent years is Calm technology, a type of information technology where the interaction between the technology and its user is designed to occur in the user's periphery rather than constantly at the center of attention. Case describes it as a technology that "gets out of your way and lets you live your life." In 2015 she published the book Calm Technology on the subject. In 2024 she founded the Calm Tech Institute, which launched a third‑party certification for low‑distraction devices in 2024.

== Works ==
- An Illustrated Dictionary of Cyborg Anthropology (CreateSpace, January 2014)
- Designing Calm Technology (O'Reilly Books, October 2015)
- Designing with Sound: Fundamentals for Products and Services (co-author Aaron Day) (O'Reilly Media, Inc., December 2018)
- A Kids Book About Technology (A Kids Book About, 2021)

== Awards and honours ==
In 2010 Fastcompany magazine named Case as one of the most influential women in technology.

== Appearances ==
In January 2011, Case performed a TED Talks titled 'We Are All Cyborgs Now.'

Case gave a talk at the 'ePharma IMPACT' 2019 conference, which took place in 19–21 March 2019 in New York, NY.
