= Olivier Mével =

French entrepreneur (born 1967)

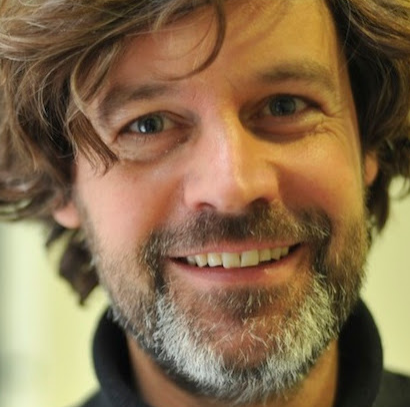
- Born: April 27, 1967 (age 59)
- Occupations: Co-founder of ReaDIYmate; Co-founder of Enero; Co-organizer of IoT Paris Meetups; Co-inventor of Nabaztag

Olivier Mével (born April 27, 1967) is a French pioneer in the Internet of Things (IoT). Trained as an engineer, he is a serial entrepreneur and businessman with a passion for creating interactive web-connected objects. Mével is the co-inventor of Nabaztag, a Wi-Fi enabled ambient electronic device shaped like a rabbit.

In 2012, Mével was named one of 100 French digital influencers and, in 2014, one of 20 French personalities that made an impact on the Internet of Things.

== Career ==
Mével graduated from the École Nationale Supérieure de Techniques Avancées (ENSTA ParisTech) in 1990. In 1995, he co-founded BaBeL@STaL, one of the first French digital agencies, with Philippe Feinsilber.

Olivier Mével has been involved in several notable ventures throughout his career. In 2000, he was part of the team behind Kasskooye.com, a popular French website known for its satire of the new economy. He contributed under the pseudonym Igmar Andersen.

In 2003, he co-founded Violet with Rafi Haladjian, Violet created Nabaztag, an interactive and internet-connected object launched in 2005, along with RFID reader Mir:ror. He's listed as inventor on 2 patents related to ambient and connected devices.

In 2009, Mével and Marc Chareyron co-founded reaDIYmate. The reaDIYmate DIY kits were successfully launched and manufactured in 2012 on Kickstarter. The duo also created TeleSound which, on its preliminary campaign, did not gather sufficient funds for full-scale manufacturing and is awaiting future re-launch.

The collaboration between Mével and Chareyron extended to Enero, a design and technology consultancy specializing in the Internet of Things.

Mével is a mentor for the hardware accelerator program Haxlr8r and a co-organizer of the Internet of Things Paris Meetups (#iotparis).
