= Smart beach =

A smart beach is a beach that incorporates technologies such as AI (Artificial Intelligence), automatic drowning detection, riptide detection, wireless communications, sensing, and metasensing (the sensing of sensing) often combining aspects of these three purposes: (1) water safety, e.g. accident reduction, (2) public safety, e.g. crime reduction, and (3) operational efficiency, e.g. allocation of lifeguard resources, promotion of tourism (providing remote views of the beach, etc.), research (e.g. collection of research data).

Some systems and technologies touch on all three aspects, e.g. systems that automatically sense beach crowding and simultaneously display the results on a traffic-light-like system to indicate to beachgoers how crowded a beach is.

Many of these systems use smart city technology applied to beach life, combined with smartphone apps.

Water safety: Water safety is often provided through automated drowning detection technologies such as automatic riptide detection, automatic drowning detection, or other related systems.

Public safety: is achieved through enhanced radio communications, wireless communications, warning lights, live video surveillance, and other sensors.

Operational efficiency: Allocation of lifeguard resources is improved which makes the beach management run more efficiently.

== See also ==
- Smart city
- Intelligent environment
