= T-commerce =

T-Commerce is a term describing trade via a (smart) digital TV-set which – besides its main functionality – acts as a marketing channel enabling bidirectional communication enabling interactive advertising and addressable advertising. It is part of Electronic Business and e-Commerce which themselves are the most prominent parts of u-Commerce. The promise of T-commerce is to enhance shopping channels as well as regular TV ads by offering consumers a "One-Click" "Buy It" possibility.

== "Television" or "Tablet"? ==
An alternative reading of T-Commerce expands the "T" to tablet which would – as tablet computers are predominantly mobile devices -then belong to the realm of mobile commerce. Irrespective of the interpretation of the "T", the extra value of the marketing channel lies in the direct interactivity the devices offer.

== Examples ==
Interactive television with pre-built-in T-commerce app that allows buying online through the television remote control was introduced by Samsung in 2012/13. H&M was one of the first companies to air a commercial with t-commerce enabled during the Super Bowl in 2014.

== See also ==
- Online shopping
