= Calm technology =

Type of information technology

Calm technology or calm design is a type of information technology where the interaction between the technology and its user is designed to occur in the user's periphery rather than constantly at the center of attention. Information from the technology smoothly shifts to the user's attention when needed but otherwise stays calmly in the user's periphery. Mark Weiser and John Seely Brown describe calm technology as "that which informs but doesn't demand our focus or attention."

The use of calm technology is paired with ubiquitous computing as a way to minimize the perceptible invasiveness of computers in everyday life.

== Principles ==
For a technology to be considered calm technology, there are three core principles it should adhere to:

1. The user's attention to the technology must reside mainly in the periphery. This means that either the technology can easily shift between the center of attention and the periphery or that much of the information conveyed by the technology is present in the periphery rather than the center.
2. The technology increases a user's use of his or her periphery. This creates a pleasant user experience by not overburdening the user with information.
3. The technology relays a sense of familiarity to the user and allows awareness of the user's surroundings in the past, present, and future.

== History ==
The phrase "calm technology" was first published in the 1995 article 'Designing Calm Technology' by Mark Weiser and John Seely Brown, as part of their research on ubiquitous computing at Xerox PARC. While their work introduced the concept, a structured set of principles was not fully articulated at the time.

Weiser introduced the concept of calm technology by using the example of LiveWire or "Dangling String". It is an eight-foot (2.4 m) string connected to the mounted small electric motor in the ceiling. The motor is connected to a nearby Ethernet cable. When a bit of information flows through that Ethernet cable, it causes a twitch of the motor. The more the information flows, the motor runs faster, thus creating the string to dangle or whirl depending on how much network traffic is. It has aesthetic appeal; it provides a visualization of network traffic but without being obtrusive.

In 2015, Amber Case built upon Weiser and Brown's ideas, creating a formalized set of principles for designing calm technology. These principles were published in her book "Calm Technology: Principles and Patterns for Non-Intrusive Design" (O'Reilly Media), which became an influential guide in the field.

Case has since been the leading advocate for Calm Technology, giving talks at TED, Microsoft, and MIT Media Lab, and consulting for major tech firms. She further advanced the field by founding the "Calm Tech Institute" in 2024 and launching the "Calm Tech Certified™" program to establish measurable standards for attention-aware product design.

== Implementation and examples ==
Video conferences are an example of calm technology. Information conveyed such as through gestures and facial expressions can be gathered, as opposed to telephone conferences which do not provide this peripheral information.

Smart homes are an extension of calm technology due to their emphasis on awareness and adaptability to the user's needs.

From 2001 to 2003, the EU funded 17 projects under an initiative called "The Disappearing Computer". The goal of this initiative was to explore new concepts and techniques that would lead to the development of calm technologies for people-friendly environments.

In the emerging field of augmented reality (AR) we see a variety of emerging calm technologies. For example, the Apple Vision Pro's EyeSight feature, which reveals the wearer's eyes as someone approaches them. Beyond that, the ability for users to navigate menus with their body, rather than requiring controllers, is another step for VR/AR technology into the realm of calm technology.

== Future research ==
In October 2024, the "Calm Tech Institute" introduced the "Calm Tech Certified™" program, described as "the world's first standard for attention and technology." The certification evaluates products across six categories: "attention, periphery, durability, light, sound, and materials." Early certified products include the "mui board 2nd Generation" by Kyoto-based mui Lab, the "reMarkable Paper Pro", and the "Airthings View Plus air quality monitor."

Another development of calm technology is its transformation into unattended technology, where the technology always exists in the periphery and never requires central attention from the user.

Due to mobile technology trends towards pervasive computing, ambient intelligence, and miniaturization, calm technology is becoming a more integral part of these devices.

== See also ==
- Human-centered computing (discipline)
- Human-computer interaction
