= Webinos =

Computing platform

webinos (Secure WebOS Application Environment) is a computing platform for the development of software components that are independent of the utilized computer hardware or operating system. At the same time, webinos is the name of the EU-funded project aiming to deliver this platform. The webinos platform is based on open-source software. Its objective is to enable web applications and services to be used and shared consistently and securely over a broad spectrum of converged and connected devices (cross-platform and cross-domain), including mobile, PC, home media (TV) and in-car units. More than 5,400 developers have already downloaded the webinos operating system.

== Technology ==
=== Central concepts ===
The webinos technology has been built on HTML5, widget and device API standards. Thus common web browsers such as Mozilla Firefox or Google Chrome can run webinos-enabled apps. To handle the cross device challenges, three central concepts have been followed: First, a method of binding devices to individuals, and for the individuals to declare their identities is the concept of “Personal Zones”. It is built up from internet agents (Personal Zone Hub) and device agents (Personal Zone Proxy) that communicate and identify each other and ensure that transmitted data is safeguarded. Furthermore, the “Remoting and Discovery” approach enables devices to broadcast their services as well as applications to discover these services and a protocol for invoking these services. Finally, a virtualized network overlays the physical networks, allowing devices to communicate optimally. This “Overlay network” runs over the internet or over local Bluetooth.

=== Architecture ===
The core webinos architecture is based on widget and web runtimes, which consist of rendering components, policy and permission frameworks, packaging components and extended APIs. To realize the cross device communication, webinos has split the packaging, policy and API extensions from the renderer. By loosely coupling these hitherto monolithic components, it is far easier to expose the application centric components to other devices.

=== Security ===
The addressed challenges comprise: how to provision and adapt security across a range of devices, services, networks as well as how individuals can gain control over the privacy aspects of their web presence regardless of the service that is being used.

== Project and consortium ==
The project receives 10 million Euros co-funding, under the EU FP7 ICT Programme, No 257103, and has a total budget of 14 million Euros. Webinos has been initiated by a research consortium with the Fraunhofer Institute for Open Communication Systems, Fraunhofer FOKUS, at the helm and will run for three years starting in September 2010.

More than 30 partners are represented within the consortium:

- Agora Media (UK),
- AmbieSense Ltd (UK),
- Antenna Software (UK),
- BMW Forschung und Technik GmbH (DE),
- Cloud Friends (B),
- Data Driven Standardization Consulting (AU),
- Deutsche Telekom (DE),
- DOCOMO Communications Laboratories Europe (GmbH),
- Fraunhofer Gesellschaft zur Förderung der angewandten Forschung e.V. (DE),
- futuretext (UK),
- IBBT (B),
- Impleo (UK),
- KT (KR),
- Istituto Superiore Mario Boella (I),
- National Technical University of Athens (GR),
- Nederlandse Organisatie voor toegepast Natuurwetenschappelijk Onderzoek (NL),
- Nitobi (CA),
- Politecnico di Torino (I),
- Present Technologies (PT),
- Samsung Electronics (UK) Ltd,
- Silver Probe Consulting Ltd (UK),
- Sony Mobile Communications AB (S),
- Technical University of Munich (DE),
- Telecom Italia S.p.A. (I),
- Telecom Paristech (FR),
- Telefónica (ES),
- Università degli Studi di Catania (I),
- University of Oxford (UK),
- VisionMobile Ltd. (UK),
- W3C (F).

== See also ==
webinos
Fraunhofer FOKUS
