= Ambient intelligence =

Electronic devices detecting human presence

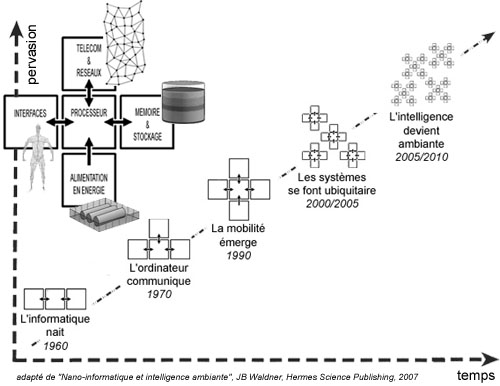
An (expected) evolution of computing from 1960 to 2010

Ambient intelligence (AmI) refers to environments with electronic devices that are aware of and can recognize the presence of human beings and adapt accordingly. This concept encompasses various technologies in consumer electronics, telecommunications, and computing. Its primary purpose is to enhance user interactions through context-aware systems.

AmI aims to create environments where devices communicate seamlessly with users, leveraging data from interconnected systems. A common example of Aml is the Internet of things (IoT), which integrates everyday devices into networks that provide intelligent responses based on user behavior.

The term "ambient intelligence" was coined in the late 1990s by Eli Zelkha and his team at Palo Alto Ventures. The project envisioned a future where technology would seamlessly blend with daily life. In the early 2000s, the concept gained further attention when the Information Society and Technology Advisory Group (ISTAG) of the European Commission published a series of reports on the topic.

Ambient intelligence has been characterized as a speculative or imaginary concept.

== Overview ==
The concept of ambient intelligence builds upon pervasive computing, ubiquitous computing, profiling, context awareness, and human-centered computer interaction design. It is characterized by systems and technologies that are:

- Embedded: Networked devices are integrated into their environment.
- Transparent: The devices themselves are invisible to users, providing unobtrusive interaction.
- Context aware: The devices can sense people and their situations.
- Personalized: They can be tailored to meet the user's needs.
- Adaptive: They are capable of changing in response to human use.
- Anticipatory: They can calculate a user's preferences based on their past behavior.

The implementation of ambient intelligence requires several technologies to exist. These include hidden hardware that benefit from miniaturisation, nanotechnology, and smart devices, along with human-centered computer interfaces (intelligent agents, multimodal interaction, context awareness, etc.). These systems and devices operate through a seamless mobile or fixed communication and computing infrastructure characterized by interoperability, wired and Wireless networks, and service-oriented architecture. Systems and devices must also be dependable and secure. This could be achieved through self-testing and self-repairing software and privacy-ensuring technology.

Ambient intelligence has a relationship with and depends on advances in sensor technology and sensor networks.

User experience became more important to developers in the late 1990s as a result of experiences with digital products that were difficult to understand or use. In response, user experience design emerged to create new technologies and media around the user's personal experience. Ambient intelligence is influenced by user-centered design, in which the user is placed in the centre of design activity and gives feedback to the designer.

== History and invention ==
In 1998, the management board of Philips Research commissioned a series of presentations and internal workshops organized by Eli Zelkha and Brian Epstein of Palo Alto Ventures. They investigated future scenarios and how consumer devices might advance over the next quarter-century. Zelkha and Epstein described the high-volume consumer electronics industry of the 1990s as "fragmented with features", contrasted by what they envisioned as the emergence of industry trends where user-friendly devices would support ubiquitous information, communication, and entertainment by 2020. As a result, the term "ambient intelligence" was coined.

While developing the ambient intelligence concept, Palo Alto Ventures created the keynote address for Roel Pieper of Philips for the Digital Living Room Conference of 1998, which included Eli Zelkha, Brian Epstein, Simon Birrell, Doug Randall and Clark Dodsworth. In 2000, there were plans to construct a feasible and usable facility dedicated to ambient intelligence; these led to the opening of HomeLab on April 24, 2002. In 2005, Philips joined the Oxygen Alliance, an international consortium of industrial partners within the context of MIT's Oxygen Project, which was aimed at developing technology for the computer of the 21st century.

In parallel to the development of the concept and vision of "ambient intelligence" at Philips, several other initiatives were also starting to explore the concept of ambient intelligence. Following the advice of the Information Society and Technology Advisory Group (ISTAG), the European Commission used the vision for the launch of their sixth framework (FP6) in Information, Society and Technology, with a budget of 3.7 billion euros.

During the first decade of the 21st century, several significant initiatives were launched. The Fraunhofer Society started several such activities, including multimedia, micro-system design, and augmented spaces. MIT started an ambient intelligence research group at their Media Lab. Several more research projects were started in countries such as the United States, Canada, Spain, France, and the Netherlands. Since 2004, the European Symposium on Ambient Intelligence (EUSAI) and many other conferences have been held that address special topics in ambient intelligence.

== Social and political aspects ==
Europe's ISTAG suggests that society may be encouraged to use ambient intelligence if AmI projects are able to meet the following criteria:

- Facilitate human contact.
- Are oriented towards community and cultural enhancement.
- Help to build knowledge and skills for work, better quality of work, citizenship, and consumer choice.
- Inspire trust and confidence.
- Are consistent with long-term personal, societal, and environmental sustainability and with lifelong learning.
- Are made easy to live with and control by ordinary people.

== Technologies ==
A variety of technologies can be used to enable ambient intelligence environments, such as:

- Bluetooth Low Energy
- RFID
- Microchip implant
- Sensors: ambient light sensors (photodetectors), thermometers, proximity sensors, and motion detectors
- Software agents
- Affective computing
- Nanotechnology
- Biometrics
- E-textiles

== Criticism ==
The ambient intelligence concept is subject to criticism. Ambient intelligence can be immersive, personalized, context-aware, and anticipatory. These characteristics bring up societal, political, and cultural concerns about the loss of privacy. Proponents of AmI argue that applications of ambient intelligence can function without necessarily reducing privacy.

Critics also discuss the potential for concentrations of power in large organisations; a fragmented, decreasingly private society; and hyper-real environments where the virtual is indistinguishable from the real. Several research groups and communities have investigated the socioeconomic, political, and cultural aspects of ambient intelligence.

== Appearance in fiction ==
- The Hitchhiker's Guide to the Galaxy, 1979 novel by Douglas Adams: The doors have emotion and express this when people use them.
- The Diamond Age, 1995 novel by Neal Stephenson: It depicts a world completely changed by the full development of nanotechnology that is present everywhere.
- Minority Report (2002 film): One scene illustrates adaptive advertising where the future-consumers are identified via retinal scans and receive targeted ads.
- Her (2013 film): The opening scene depicts the protagonist commuting home. Upon arriving, the various lights throughout the apartment are turned on as the character moves through the rooms (automated lighting control). A later scene shows that an artificial entity can also control these systems, changing a song in the background to lighten a situation and for humorous effect.

== See also ==
- Ambient awareness
- Ambient IoT
- Ambient media
- Augmented reality
- Spatial computing
- Autonomous agent
- Context-aware pervasive systems
- Cyborg
- Embodied agent
- Intelligent control
- Edge computing
- Mobile computing
- Multi-agent system
- PositiveID
- Spatial contextual awareness
- Wireless sensor network

== Bibliography ==
- Zelkha, Eli; Epstein, Brian; Birrell, Simon; Dodsworth, Clark (1998), "From Devices to "Ambient Intelligence"", Digital Living Room Conference (published June 1998)
- Aarts, Emile; Harwig, Rick; Schuurmans, Martin (2007), chapter "Ambient Intelligence" in The Invisible Future: The Seamless Integration Of Technology Into Everyday Life, McGraw-Hill Companies
- Aarts, Emile; Marzano, Stefano (2003), The New Everyday: Visions of Ambient Intelligence, 010 Publishers
- Bieliková, Mária; Krajcovic, Tibor (2001), "Ambient Intelligence within a Home Environment", ERCIM News (47) (published October 2001)
- Parker, Pamela (2002), "Interactive Ads Play Big Role in "Minority Report"", ClickZ (published June 21, 2002)
- Gasson, Mark; Warwick, Kevin (2013), "D12.2: Study on Emerging AmI Technologies", FIDIS Deliverables, 12 (2)
