= Rafi Haladjian =

French entrepreneur (born 1961)

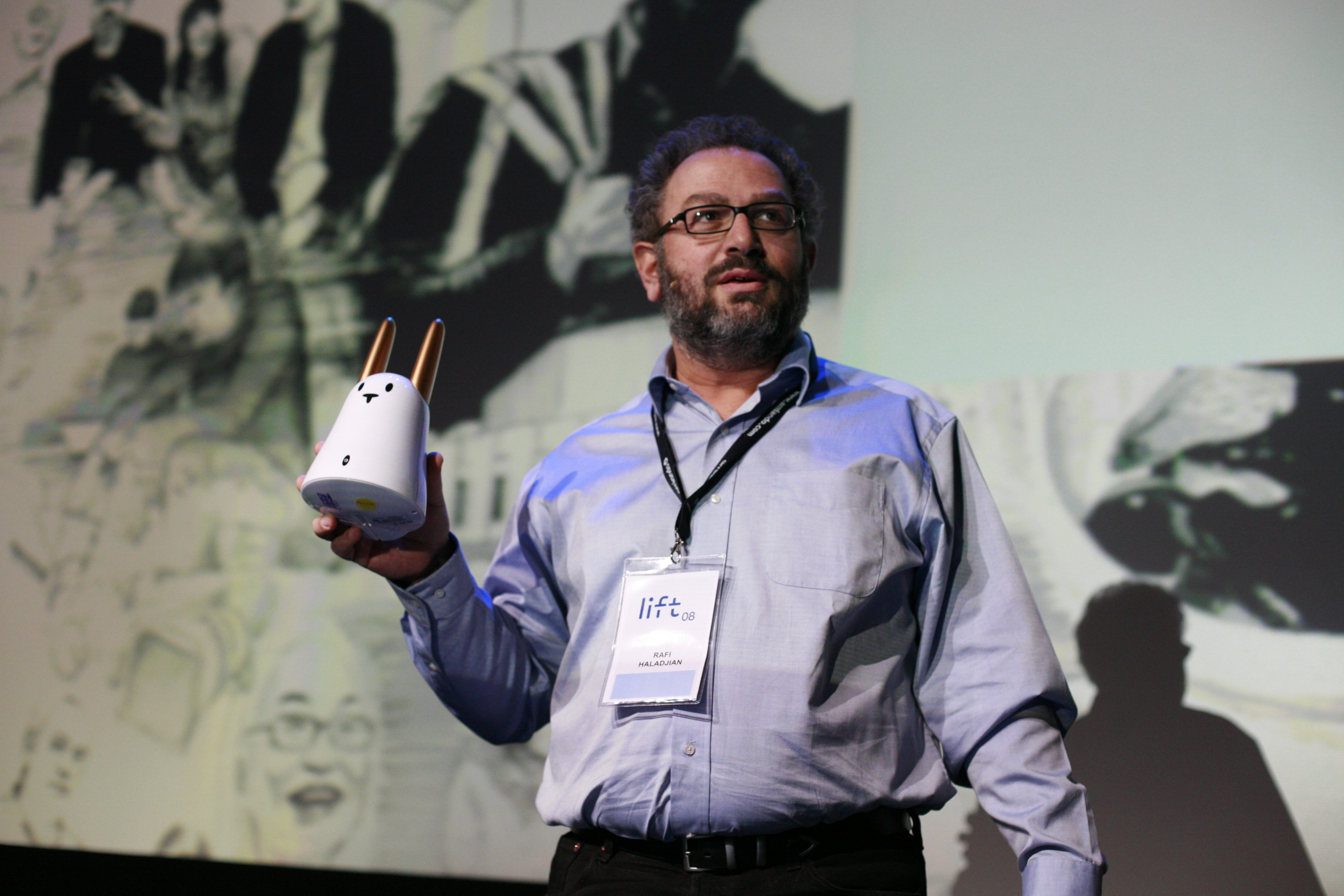
- Rafi Haladjian holding a Nabaztag
- Born: 1961 (age 64–65); Beirut, Lebanon

Rafi Haladjian (Armenian: Րաֆֆի Հալաջյան; born in Beirut, Lebanon in 1961) is a French entrepreneur of Armenian origin known for his work in early internet services and connected devices. He co-founded FranceNet, one of France's first Internet service providers, and is the co-creator of the Nabaztag, a WiFi enabled device associated with the development of Internet of Things technologies.

== Early life and education ==
Haladjian was born in Beirut, Lebanon, and later moved to France, where he studied linguistics and semiotics.

== Career ==
Haladjian began working in telecommunications in the early 1980s, during the era of France’s Minitel system, an early online service that predated the modern Internet.

In 1994, he co-founded FranceNet, one of the first Internet service providers in France. The company was later renamed Fluxus and sold in 2001.

He later launched Ozone, a wireless network initiative in Paris focused on expanding Wi-Fi access by deploying antennas on rooftops and enabling continuous connectivity beyond fixed hotspots.

In 2003, he co-founded Violet, which developed the Nabaztag, a Wi-Fi-connected rabbit-shaped device capable of delivering information through audio and visual signals.

In 2009, Haladjian founded Sen.se, a company focused on connected devices. In 2014, it introduced Mother, a connected home hub designed to monitor daily activities through sensor.
