= Ambient Devices =

American electronic device company

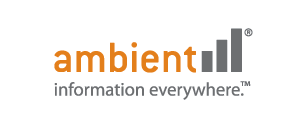

Ambient Devices, Inc. is a privately held company founded in 2001 and based in Cambridge, Massachusetts, USA that designs and markets various ambient devices for display of information ranging from weather to traffic reports to stock quotes. The company was founded by David L. Rose, Ben Resner, Nabeel Hyatt and Pritesh Gandhi, and is a spin-off from the MIT Media Lab. The company also maintains the Ambient Information Network, a U.S. nationwide datacasting network presently hosted by U.S.A. Mobility, a U.S. paging service. The service is similar to the discontinued Microsoft's SPOT service.

== Products ==
- Ambient Orb – March 2002
- Ambient Weather Beacon – 2003
- Ambient Weather Forecaster – 2004
- Ambient Dashboard – 2004
- Ambient Wireless Datacasting Kit – March 2005
- Ambient 5-Day Weather Forecaster launched at Brookstone
- Ambient Google Clock – (in development)
- Ambient Umbrella – 2007
- Ambient Energy Joule - 2007
- Ambient Flurry Alarm Clock - 2011

== Services ==
Ambient Devices ran a data network called "Ambient Information Network" that sent weather, stock market activity, sport scores, energy pricing and usage using a paging network that utilizes encoded FM radio stations to send out a data broadcast signals to Ambient devices. Ambient stopped transmitting these signals in 2019, rendering devices that were dependent on them useless.

They also sell forecasting services to utility companies so that customers can reduce their energy usage when utilities are encountering peak usage and need an automated way of reducing energy consumption in homes and businesses.

== Controversy ==
Brookstone licensed and sold an Ambient device called the "Brookstone Weathercast Wireless 5-day Forecaster." Consumers who bought this weather reporting device found out in February 2018 that Ambient Devices would no longer be sending data to these devices, rendering them e-waste.
