= Ambient media =

Ambient media are out-of-home advertising products and services determined by some as non-traditional or alternative media. Examples are messages on the backs of car park receipts, on hanging straps in railway carriages, posters inside sports club locker rooms and on the handles of supermarket trolleys. It also includes such techniques as projecting huge images on the sides of buildings, or slogans on the gas bags of hot air balloons.

Ambient media in a larger scale define the media environment and the communication of information in ubiquitous and pervasive environments. The concept of ambient media relates to ambient media form, ambient media content, and ambient media technology. These new technologies are based on ambient intelligent technology and create new possibilities in ambient advertising. Its principles are manifestation, morphing, intelligence, and experience and have been defined by Artur Lugmayr and its business models are described in Multimedia Tools and Applications.

Ambient advertising, as per many advertising agencies, also refers to advertising at locations where people spend more time. These include shopping malls, multiplexes, coffee shops, gyms, sporting clubs, amusement parks, etc. These advertising formats can be static, digital or experiential. Ambient advertising uses 'consumer dwell time' as the core insight behind advertising at these places. It is believed that compared to traditional out-of-home billboard advertising, ambient advertising gives scope for higher consumer engagement for the ad, as well as drive contextually relevant communication for the advertiser.

The term started to appear in British media jargon around 1999, but now seems to be firmly established as a standard term within the advertising industry. One of the driving agencies was the advertising agency Concord (UK). Ambient media advertising can be used in conjunction with mainstream traditional media, or used equally effectively as a stand-alone activity. The key to a successful ambient media campaign is to choose the best media format available and combine it with effective messaging.

Ambient media advertising is only a niche for advertising agencies of overcoming traditional methods of advertising to get the attention of consumers. The following are some reasons for the growth of ambient media:

- A decline in the power of traditional media.
- A greater demand for point-of-sale communications.
- Its ability to offer precise audience targeting.
- Its general versatility.

Ambient advertisements are an effective means at pushing a brand message in front of consumers and can develop even better top of mind recall within target audiences. This provides the ability to advertisers to maintain brand awareness created by other advertising effoy activities.

== See also ==
- Guerrilla marketing
- Out-of-home advertising
