= V-business =

v-Business is the sale of real or virtual products from a virtual world. v-Business or virtual business is a term was first mentioned in "E-Commerce and V-Business: Business Models for Global Success" by Stuart Barnes, Brian Hunt, et al. (ISBN 978-0750645324). IBM strategic outlook projects a large percentage business transactions and business processing will be conducted in or enabled by virtual world technology.
