= Ambient IoT =

Technology concept

Ambient IoT, from ambient and Internet of things, is a concept originally coined by 3GPP that is used in the technology industry referring to an ecosystem of a large number of objects in which every item is connected into a wireless sensor network using low-cost self-powered sensor nodes. Bluetooth SIG has assessed the total addressable market of Ambient IoT to be more than 10 trillion devices across different verticals.

The applications of Ambient IoT include making supply chains for food and medicine more efficient and sustainable, protecting from counterfeiting and delivering the data required for advanced transportation and smart city initiatives. Ambient IoT has been called "the original vision for the IoT" by U.S. Department of Commerce IoT Advisory Board chair Benson Chan.

Standards for Ambient IoT are being considered by 3GPP, IEEE and Bluetooth SIG.

Walmart announced a major deployment of ambient IoT sensors in October 2025.

In recent years, Ambient IoT has attracted increasing interest from major technology and retail companies because of its potential to connect very large numbers of everyday objects without requiring conventional batteries. The technology is particularly suited to items such as products, packages, labels and containers, where small sensors can collect and transmit information throughout their lifecycle. Its development is expected to support increasingly automated supply chains and other large-scale connected environments.
