= Mark Weiser =

American computer scientist

- Born: July 23, 1952; Harvey, Illinois, U.S.
- Died: April 27, 1999 (aged 46); Palo Alto, California, U.S.
- Education: New College of Florida; University of Michigan (MA, PhD)
- Known for: Ubiquitous computing

Mark D. Weiser (July 23, 1952 – April 27, 1999) was an American computer scientist and chief technology officer (CTO) at Xerox PARC. Weiser is widely considered to be the father of ubiquitous computing, a term he coined in 1988. Within Silicon Valley, Weiser was broadly viewed as a visionary and computer pioneer, and his ideas have influenced many of the world's leading computer scientists.

== Early life and education ==
Weiser was born in Chicago, Illinois, to David and Audra Weiser. He grew up in Stony Brook, New York. He moved to Sarasota, Florida, to study philosophy at New College of Florida but dropped out in his second year when he ran out of money. He then moved to Ann Arbor, Michigan, where he found a job as a computer programmer. While working as a computer programmer he began taking computer science classes and excelled to the point that he was directly admitted into a master's program at the University of Michigan. He studied Computer and Communication Science at the University of Michigan, receiving an M.A. in 1976, and a Ph.D. in 1979.

== Career ==
Weiser later taught computer science at the University of Maryland, College Park and became associate chairman of the department in 1986.

Weiser joined PARC (then Xerox PARC) in 1987 and became manager of its computer science laboratory in 1988, the same year he pioneered the concept of ubiquitous computing. He became PARC's chief technology officer in 1996.

== Honors ==
In 2001, the Association for Computing Machinery's special interest group in operating systems (SIGOPS) established the Mark Weiser Award for individuals who innovate within operating systems research. The Mark D. Weiser Excellence in Computing Scholarship Fund at the University of California, Berkeley was also established in Weiser's memory.

== Personal life ==
In addition to his work in the field of computer science, Weiser was also the drummer for the avant-garde/experimental rock band, Severe Tire Damage, which was the first band to broadcast live over the Internet.

On April 27, 1999, Weiser died of liver failure that was caused by cancer.

== Ubiquitous computing and calm technology ==
Ubiquitous computing names the third wave in computing, just now beginning. First were mainframes, each shared by lots of people. Now we are in the personal computing era, person and machine staring uneasily at each other across the desktop. Next comes ubiquitous computing, or the age of calm technology, when technology recedes into the background of our lives.

— Mark Weiser

During one of his talks, Weiser outlined a set of principles describing ubiquitous computing:

- The purpose of a computer is to help you do something else.
- The best computer is a quiet, invisible servant.
- The more you can do by intuition the smarter you are; the computer should extend your unconscious.
- Technology should create calm.

In Designing Calm Technology, Weiser and John Seely Brown describe calm technology as "that which informs but doesn't demand our focus or attention."

== Low-powered portable computing ==
Weiser advocated to look at performance in non traditional ways. Instead of measuring computational performance in MIPS, he focused on increasing the instructions per joule of energy, pushing the computer industry toward low-powered portable computing.

== Works ==
- "The Computer for the 21st Century" - Scientific American Special Issue on Communications, Computers, and Networks, September, 1991
