= Francesca Ferrando =

Contemporary philosopher

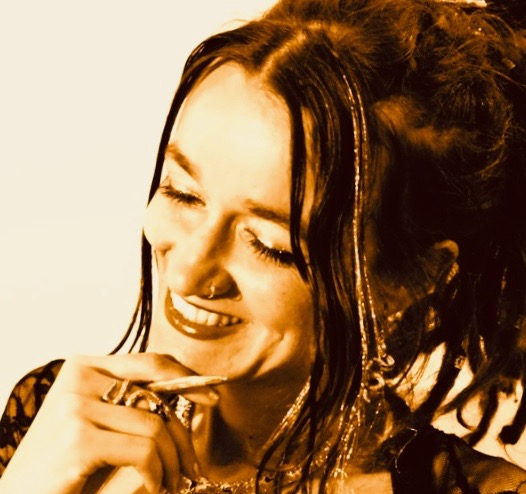
- Occupation: Philosopher
- Employer: New York University (NYU)

Education
- Education: Roma Tre University

Philosophical work
- Era: 20th-century philosophy – 21st-century philosophy
- Main interests: Posthumanism, transhumanism, philosophy of technology, ethics, gender

Francesca Ferrando (they/them) is a contemporary philosopher known for their contributions to the fields of posthumanism, transhumanism and gender. Ferrando is Assistant Professor of Philosophy at NYU Liberal Studies, Faculty of Arts and Science at the New York University in New York City, US. Their work analyses the existential implications of being human in the 21st century, exploring emerging technologies, ecology and plurality as integral parts of the global human condition. Their work has been translated into a dozen languages.

== Biography and education ==
Born in Italy, Ferrando holds a B.A. in Literature and Philosophy (summa cum laude) from the University of Turin, and an M.A. in Gender Studies from Utrecht University (Netherlands) under the supervision of Rosi Braidotti. They earned a PhD in Philosophy from the University of Roma Tre (Italy). One of their examiners was Stefan Lorenz Sorgner. Their doctoral dissertation was awarded the prize in philosophy "Vittorio Sainati" with recognition from the President of Italy Giorgio Napolitano. It was later published in Italian.

As part of their graduate studies, Ferrando conducted research on Cyborg anthropology at the University of Reading (England) under the supervision of Kevin Warwick, exploring the intersections of human enhancement and diversity, equity and inclusion. Ferrando relocated to the United States during their postgraduate studies, serving as a Visiting Scholar at Columbia University under the mentorship of Achille Varzi (philosopher).

== Posthuman philosophy ==
In the field of Posthuman Studies, Ferrando's article "Posthumanism, Transhumanism, Antihumanism, and New Materialism" (2013) was instrumental in conceptualizing the posthuman as an umbrella term that encompasses a plurality of intellectual frameworks. The article distinguishes between transhumanism and posthumanism, arguing that while transhumanism advocates for human enhancement through science and emerging technologies, posthumanism critically repositions the human within a broader planetary context in the era of the anthropocene, emphasizing a non-hierarchical perspective. Furthermore, posthumanism extends the concept of technology beyond its conventional definition, drawing from Martin Heidegger's interpretation of technology as a mode of poiesis and framing evolution itself as a transformative process that operates as a form of existential technology. This article has been translated into Chinese, Italian, Hungarian, Polish, Portuguese, Romanian, Spanish and Turkish.

Ferrando's book Philosophical Posthumanism(Bloomsbury, 2019), with a preface by Rosi Braidotti, offers a radical rethinking of what it means to be human, challenging anthropocentrism and defining philosophical posthumanism in three key layers: as a post-humanism, a post-anthropocentrism, and a post-dualism. Their work synthesizes continental philosophy, critical posthumanism, Eastern philosophies, Native epistemologies, and new materialism, engaging with thinkers such as Friedrich Nietzsche, Donna Haraway and Vandana Shiva. The book has been translated into Spanish, Russian and Korean, among other languages.

Their latest book The Art of Being Posthuman: Who Are We in the 21st Century? (Polity, 2024) focusses on self-knowledge, calling for a shift from theory to praxis. It explores the ethical, existential, and ontological dimensions of posthumanism, developing the concept of existential posthumanism—a perspective that examines the nature of existence beyond traditional humanist frameworks. The book explores the existential condition of the 21st century, drawing on sources ranging from the Paleolithic era to the potential futures of radical life extension. It incorporates insights from mystical traditions, world religions, and recent advances in science and technology, ultimately conveying the message that all beings are interconnected. It emphases unity in diversity and advocates for multispecies co-existence. It has been translated into Arabic and Korean.

Their work combines philosophical insights with a lyrical tone, leading Robin Kelley to characterize Ferrando as the 'philosopher poet of our time'. Their scholarship further explores intersections between transhumanism, posthumanism, and spirituality, addressing topics such as the future of religions, mindfulness, and technological enlightenment.

== Career and activism ==
Ferrando has been teaching Global Philosophy at NYU Liberal Studies since 2014. They have delivered over one hundred keynotes and lectures globally. In the United States, they have lectured at Ivy League universities such as Harvard University, Princeton University, and other institutions. Their lectures, conducted in English, Spanish, and Italian, have also been featured at international conferences in Asia, Europe, and Latin America. They are co-founders of the Global Posthuman Network, a platform that promotes global discussions on posthumanism through horizontal collaborations, with board members including Katherine Hayles, Dipesh Chakrabarty, and Debashish Banerji. They are affiliated with regional posthuman networks in India, Italy, Latin America, and Pakistan. They serve on several editorial and advisory boards, including the Journal of Posthuman Studies and the Lifeboat Foundation.

Beyond academia, Ferrando engages in public discourse through media appearances, with the aim of democratizing access to posthuman thought. In 2012, Ferrando became the first TED speaker to address the topic of the posthuman. They are an open-access advocate, providing the first crash course on the posthuman under a Creative Commons license on YouTube. Ferrando has contributed to bridging the fields of posthumanism and transhumanism by organizing conferences, and producing vlogs and podcasts. They have engaged in dialogues with scholars such as Aubrey de Grey, Anders Sandberg, and Natasha Vita-More. Their work has been featured internationally on platforms such as Vice Media, the Singularity Weblog, the Kathmandu Post (Nepal), El Nacional (Venezuela), and ARN Media (Australia), where they were interviewed by Kristina Borjesson. Ferrando was named among the 100 top creatives making change in the world by "Origin" magazine in the United States.

Before relocating to New York City, Ferrando was a researcher at the Research Center for Women's and Gender Studies at the University of Turin, Italy. During this time, they collaborated with theorists such as Luisa Passerini and Gianni Vattimo. In addition to their academic work, Ferrando contributed as a journalist and author, publishing with the Italian publisher Feltrinelli. During the 2008 season, they served as a television commentator on Iride, a program directed by Irene Pivetti on Odeon 24.

== Publications ==
Ferrando's academic work has been published by publishers such as Oxford University Press, Columbia University Press, MIT Press, Bloomsbury Press, Routledge, Springer, Taylor & Francis, and the European Commission, among others.
