= Anna Batori =

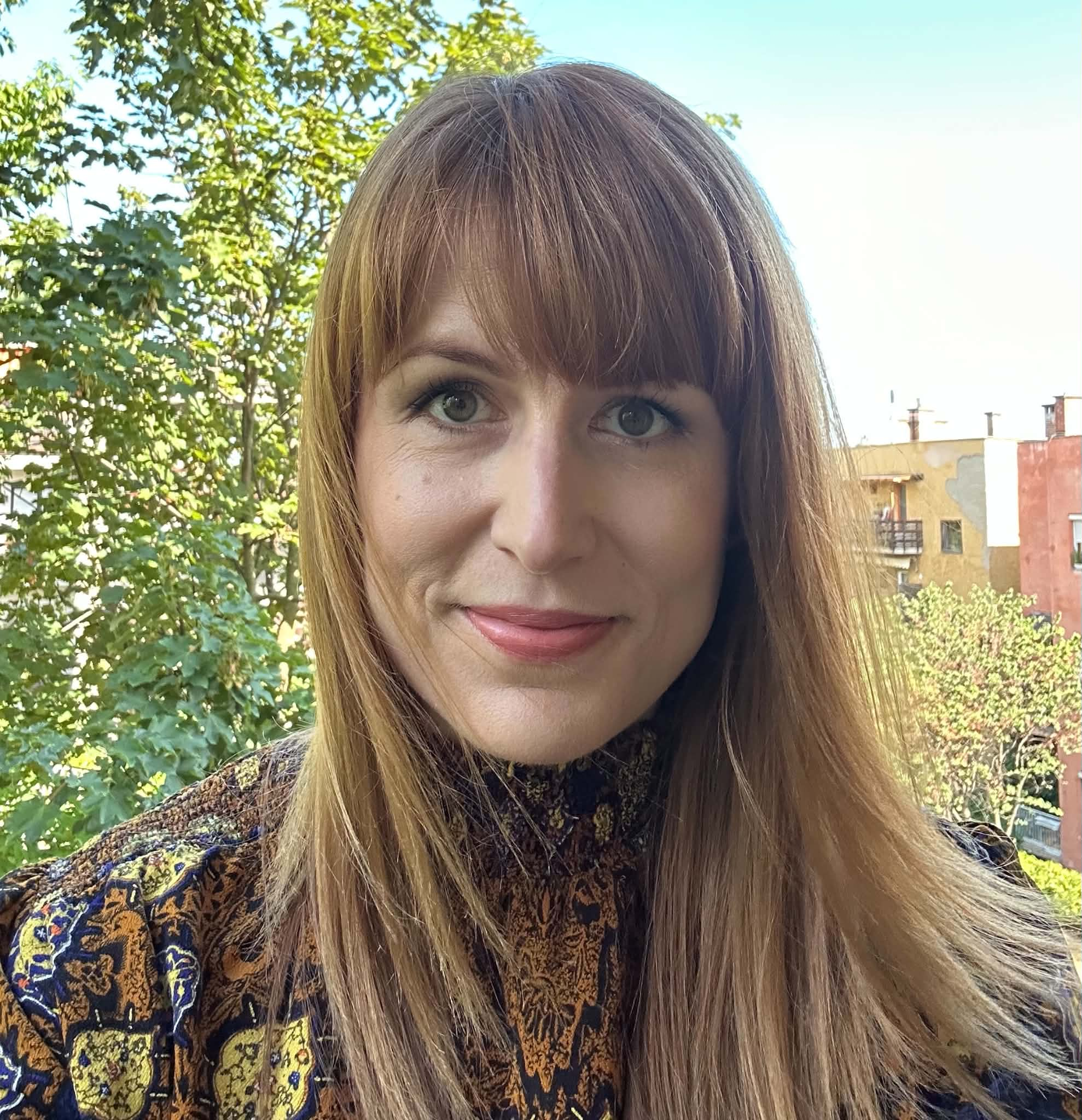
- Occupation: Author

Anna Batori is a film theorist, film historian, and a habilitated Doctor of Film and Television Studies. Her work focuses primarily on posthumanism, digital media, and cognitive studies. As of 2026, she works as an independent researcher.

== Career ==
=== Education ===
She graduated from Eötvös Loránd University, majoring in Aesthetics and Film Theory-Film History. She completed her doctoral studies at the University of Glasgow, where she obtained her PhD degree in Theater, Film and Television Studies in 2017 as a scholarship recipient of the journal Screen.

Throughout her academic career, she has taught and conducted research at several European higher education institutions. She has worked at the Babeș–Bolyai University in Cluj-Napoca, the Budapest University of Theatre and Film Arts (SZFE). Between 2019 and 2022, she was the leading researcher of the Premium Postdoctoral Program of the Hungarian Academy of Sciences.

From September 2023 to August 2024, she worked as an associate professor at the University of Theatre and Film Arts, Budapest. Since her resignation, she has been working as an independent researcher.

In 2024, she habilitated at Eötvös Loránd University.

== Major publications ==
=== Monographs in English ===
- Space in Romanian and Hungarian Cinema: Architecture and Enclosure. Palgrave Macmillan, 2018. ISBN 9783319759517
- The Extreme Cinema of Eastern Europe: Rape, Art, (S)Exploitation. Edinburgh University Press, 2024. ISBN 9781399523998
- Posthumanism, Cognition, and Cyborg Spectatorship: Amalgamated Cinema. Routledge & CRC Press, 2026. ISBN 9781032641423

=== Journal articles ===
- Batori, Anna (2025). "Genitals on Screen: Extremism and the Crisis of Gender Representation". Studies in World Cinema. doi:10.1163/26659891-bja10055.
- Batori, Anna (2024). "From Representation to Simulation: Towards a Posthuman Film Theory". In Into the Other Worlds. Routledge. doi:10.4324/9781032699776-11.
- Batori, Anna (2023). "Hierarchical Textual Compositions and (Post)colonial Framing in The View from Up Here". Short Film Studies. 13 (2): 145–150. doi:10.1386/sfs_00078_1.
- Batori, Anna (2021). "Everything Is Connected: Narratives of Temporal and Spatial Transgression in Dark". VIEW Journal of European Television History and Culture. doi:10.18146/view.246.
- Batori, Anna (2021). "The Symbiosis of Images and Non-Diegetic Sound in Lynne Ramsay's Brigitte". Short Film Studies. 11 (2): 147–153. doi:10.1386/sfs_00051_1. hdl:2262/106569.

== Sources ==
- Metropolis Journal: Anna Bátori's Author Profile
- Hungarian Scientific Bibliography (MTMT): Anna Bátori's Profile and List of Publications
- Routledge Publishing: Posthumanism, Cognition, and Cyborg Spectatorship
- Duart.hr Interview
- Research Gate: Anna Batori author
