= Kubachi silver =

Traditional handicraft

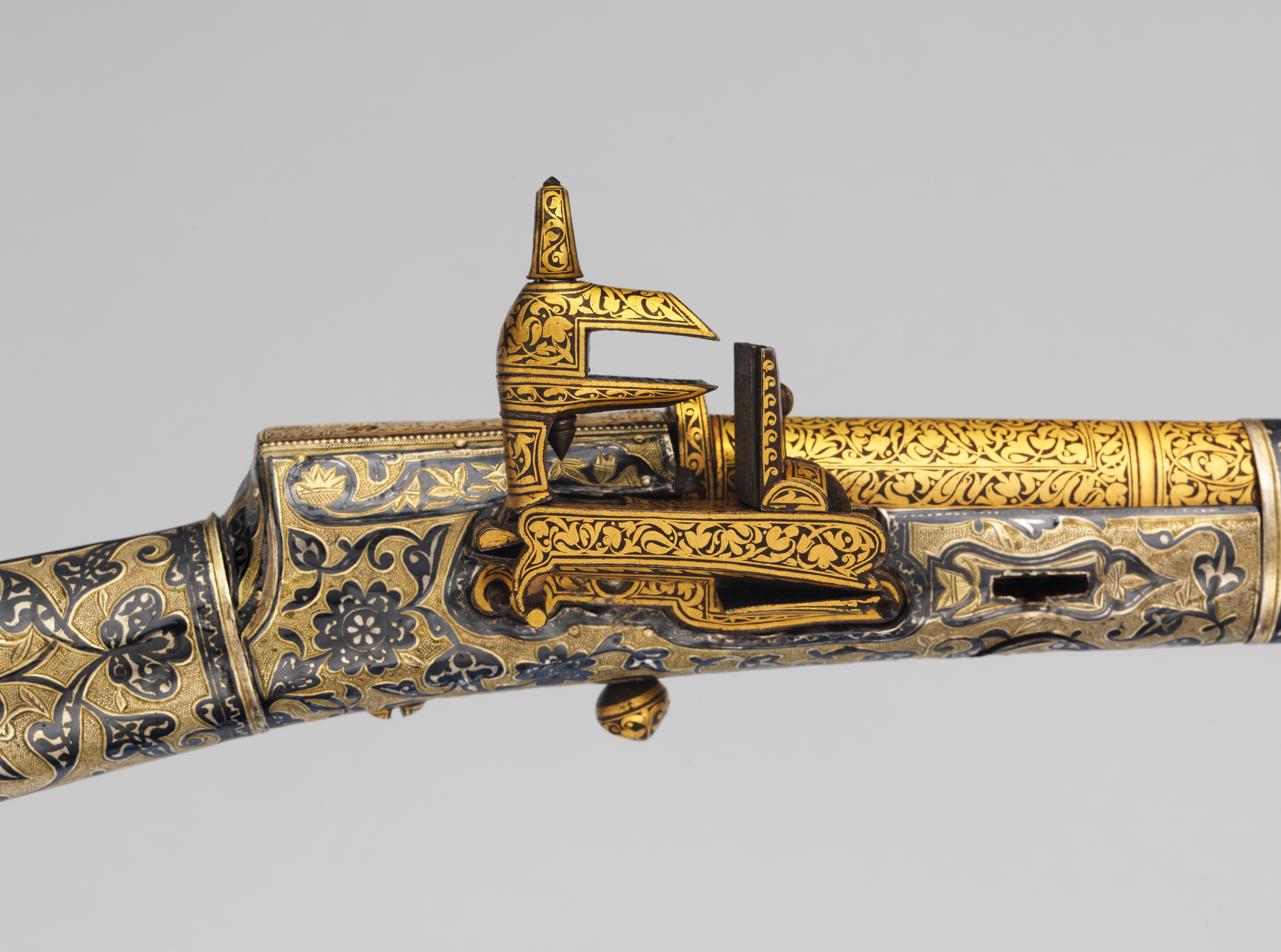
Khirimi gun, Kubachi, Dagestan, c. 1800-1850.

Kubachi silver (Russian: Кубачинское серебро) is a metalwork tradition and artistic style of silver handicrafts from the village of Kubachi in today's Republic of Dagestan, Russian Federation.

Of the roughly 2,500 people who live in Kubachi, the silversmith industry employs some 300 masters. Today, Kubachi silver is partly also produced in other parts of Dagestan as well as in the regional capital Makhachkala.

Among many items, Kubachi silver includes swords, guns, bracelets, and caskets as well as tableware such as samovars, drinking vessels, and cutlery.

In the late 19th and early 20th century, Kubachi silver was normally adorned with gold and (or) niello. The traditional nielloed Kubachi silver received so-called high acclaim at the 1937 World Exhibition in Paris. Since the middle of the 20th century, coloured enamel and semi-precious minerals, in particular turquoise, have also been used in Kubachi silver. Filigree is frequently applied.

== History ==
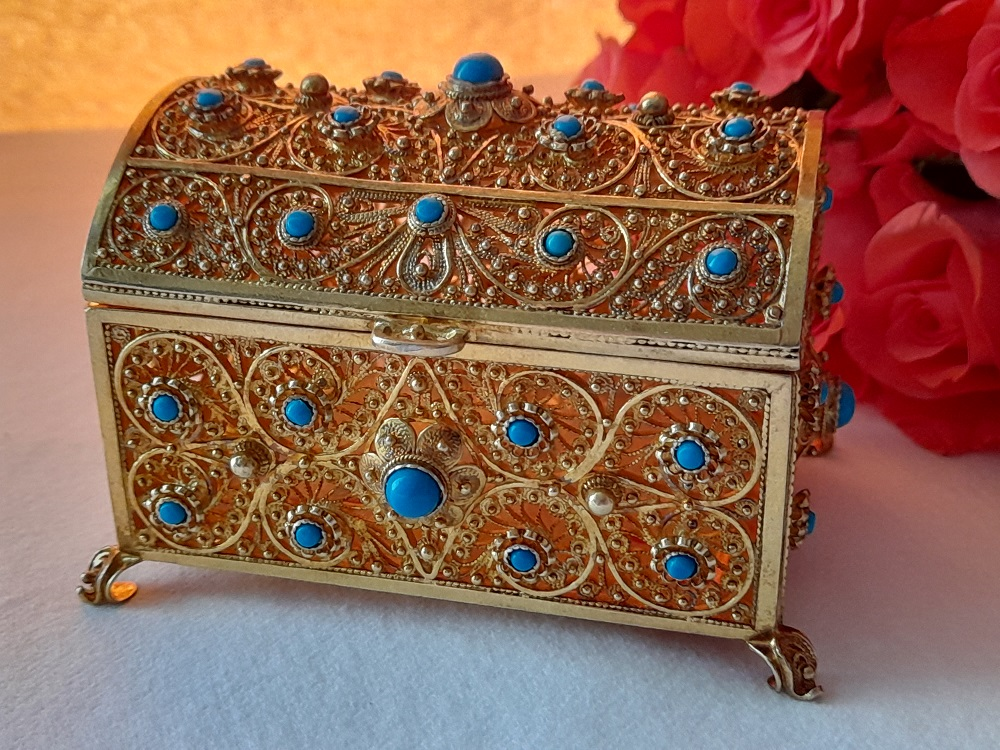
Made c. 2020 in Kubachi, this casket of gilded silver is adorned with 51 blue turquoises—reflecting the regional abundance of this semi-precious mineral. It applies filigree, a metalwork technique common in Persia and the Middle East

The origins of Kubachi silver arrived in the region with Persian traders around 2,000 years ago. In Persian chronicles of the 4th century, the village is called Zerihgeran or Zirihgheran ('armory'). The present-day name, Kubachi ('makers of weapons'), is of Turkish origin.

According to Fatima Gadzhalova and colleagues (2019), metalwork in Dagestan was 'largely promoted by the natural raw materials presence', more precisely wool, wood, stone, clay, and iron ore. Located along the trade routes between South Caucasus, the Near and Middle East, and Russia, Dagestan even had access to supplies of materials necessary for jewellery, copper minting, and so on.

In the 19th century, the Russian emperors and high nobility commissioned Kubachi silver, including decorated daggers. Emperor Alexander III gave his British counterpart Queen Victoria knives from Kubachi.

Originally looked upon with suspicion by the communist authorities, who did not endorse privately owned enterprises, Kubachi masters took part in the 1923 All-Union Agricultural Exhibition. The exposition of jewellery allegedly demonstrated the prospects of both the industry and Kubachi craftsmen.

In 1924, in the early days of the Soviet Union, a workshop in Kubachi was founded, engaging artisans not only in traditional jewellery and weapons but also silver portcigars, spoons, and other items for dining rooms. In 1932, the government of the Soviet Union reserved parts of the state silver reserves for the workshop in Kubachi, at the same time giving it the status of export cooperative.

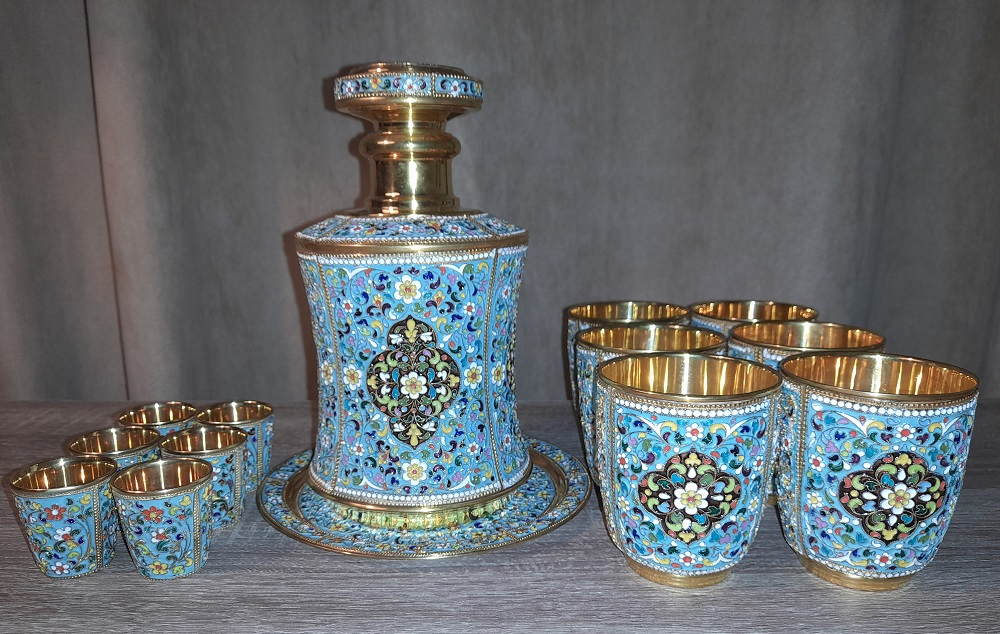
Through magazines in the Russian capital, the Kubachi silver industry supplies Moscow millionaires with exquisite silverware, such as this whisky and cognac set made of silver covered with 24-karat gold and turquoise enamel

In 1937, items produced at the workshop in Kubachi won a top prize at the International Exhibition in Paris. A direct consequence of this success, a new building was built for the workshop. In subsequent decades, the workshop, later factory, would win 18 gold and silver medals at 12 international exhibitions, including Brussels in 1958, Montreal in 1967, Osaka in 1970, Zagreb in 1981, and Copenhagen and Düsseldorf in 1982. In the middle of the 20th century, however, Kubachi masters frequently used non-precious metals in their works.

In 1960, the workshop was transformed, assuming a more contemporary name. In 1972, the leaders of the factory were awarded the Repin state prize for their achievements, and in 1975, the factory as a whole received an order of friendship between nations. During the last decades of the Soviet Union, about 800 people worked at the factory in Kubachi. In total, the factory processed an average of 3,500 kilograms of silver each year.

In the 21st century, during the economic crisis of craft businesses in the Republic of Dagestan, the factory decreased its activity, but until now, it remains the only operating business in its own village. Currently, the factory has a unique set of tools for silver smelting, lamination, and shaping of manufactured items, with masters subsequently engraving and decorating the products in their respective homes before the products return to the factory for final polishing.

== Collections ==
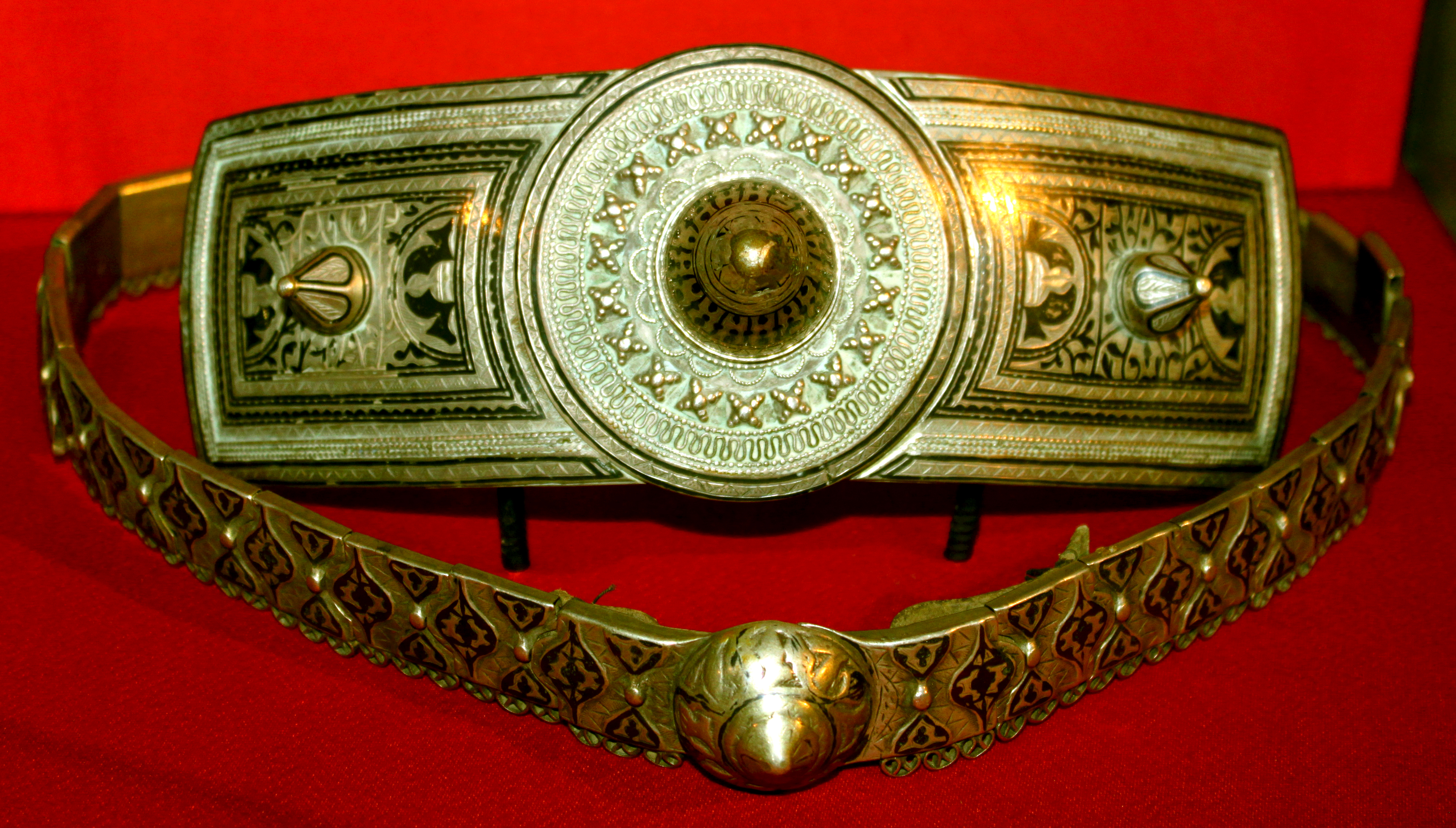
A Kubachi men's belt from the Palace of the Shirvanshahs in Baku, Azerbaijan

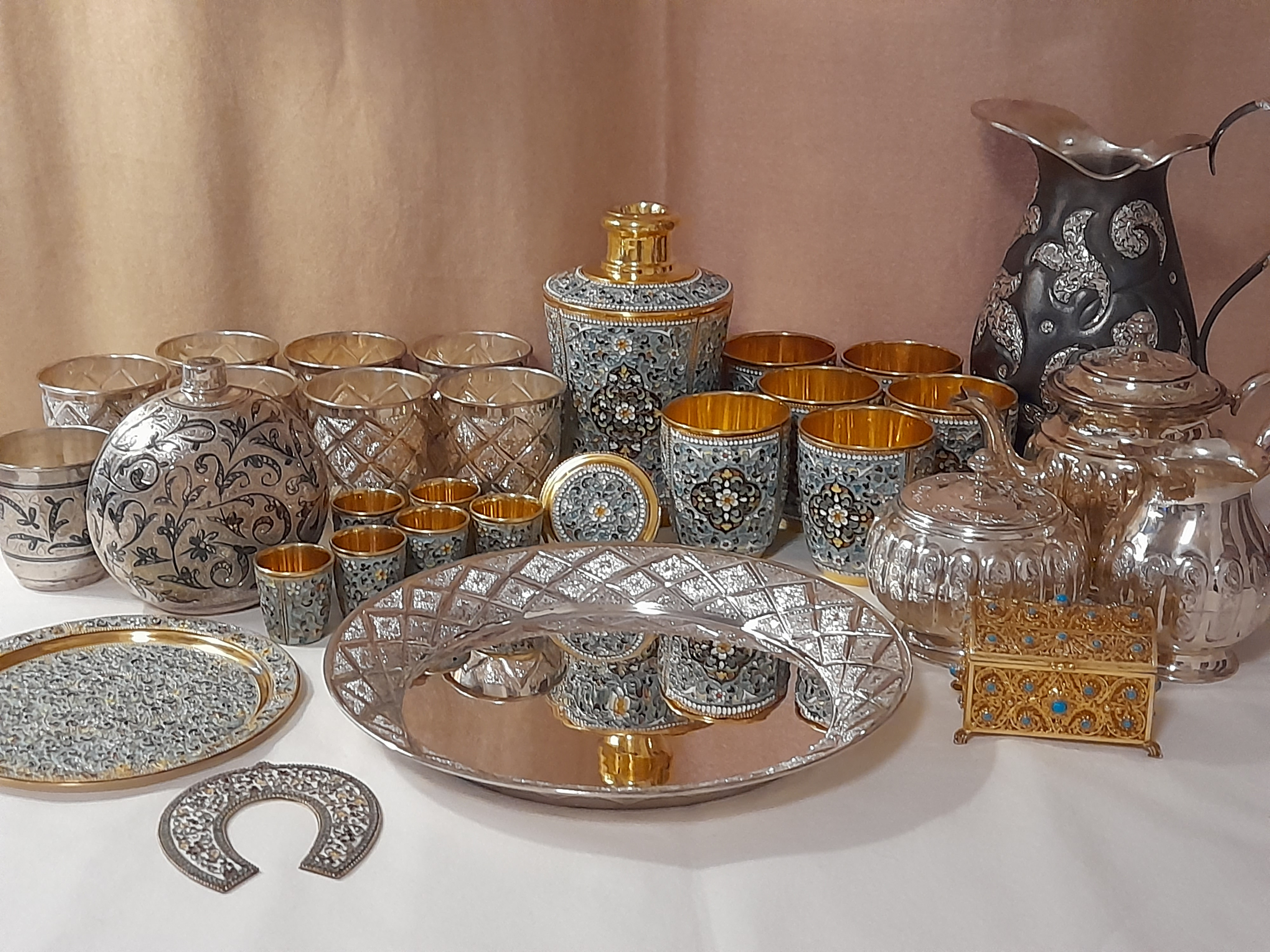
A privately-owned collection of 21st-century Kubachi silver located in Oslo, Norway

Today, the Victoria and Albert Museum owns a Kubachi shasqa sword with sheet from c. 1850 and a Kubachi pistol from c. 1840. Kubachi silver is also owned or (and) exhibited by:

- The State Historical Museum, Moscow
- The Hermitage Museum, Saint Petersburg
- Louvre, Paris
- The Metropolitan Museum of Art, New York City

There is also a factory museum in the village of Kubachi. Allegedly, the museum owns a saber of Nadir Shah, ruler of Persia 1736-1747, and a silver vase displaying the images of the first leaders of the USSR.

== Gallery ==
=== 19th century ===
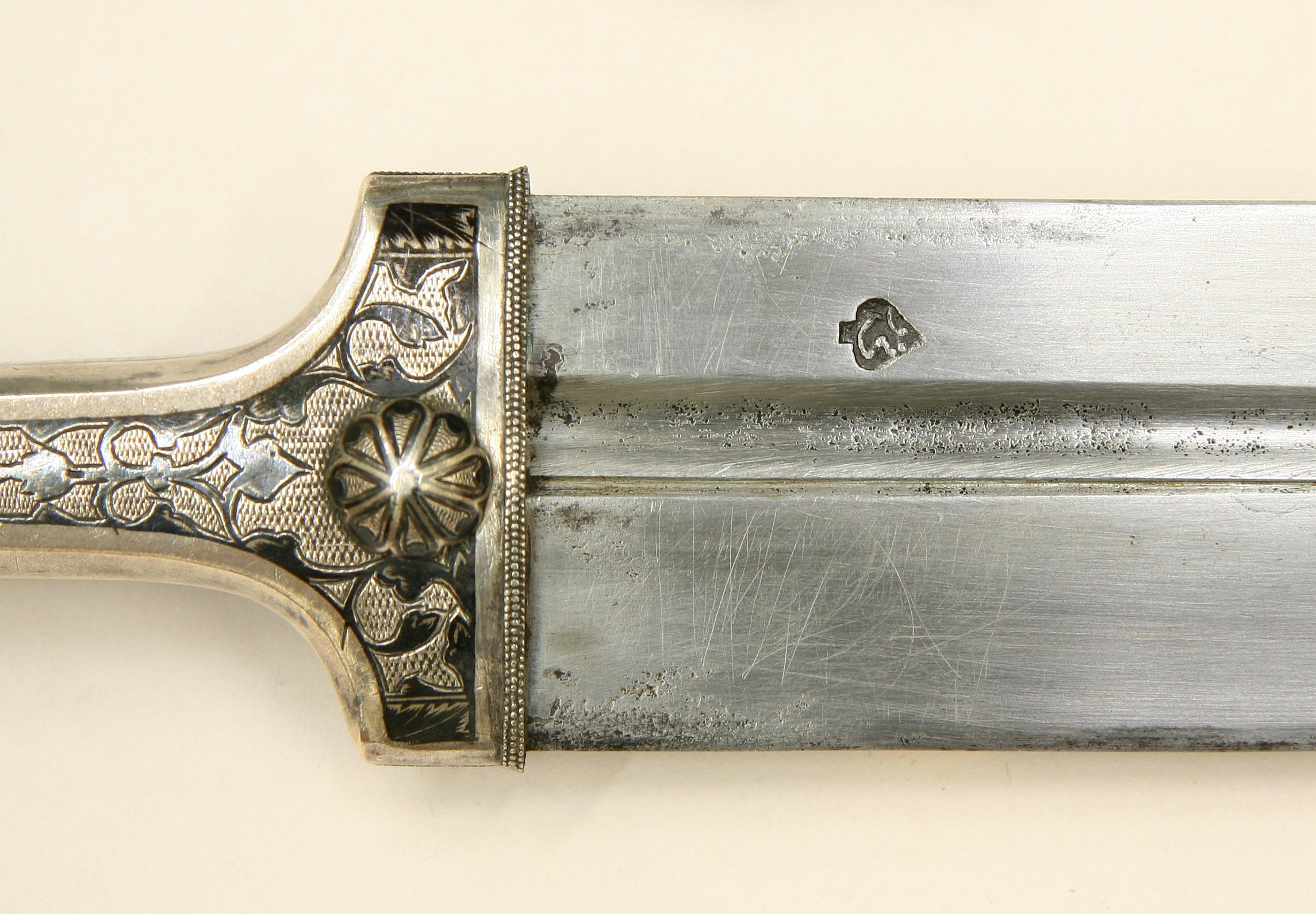
Nielloed dagger, perhaps Kubachi, c. 1818-1819

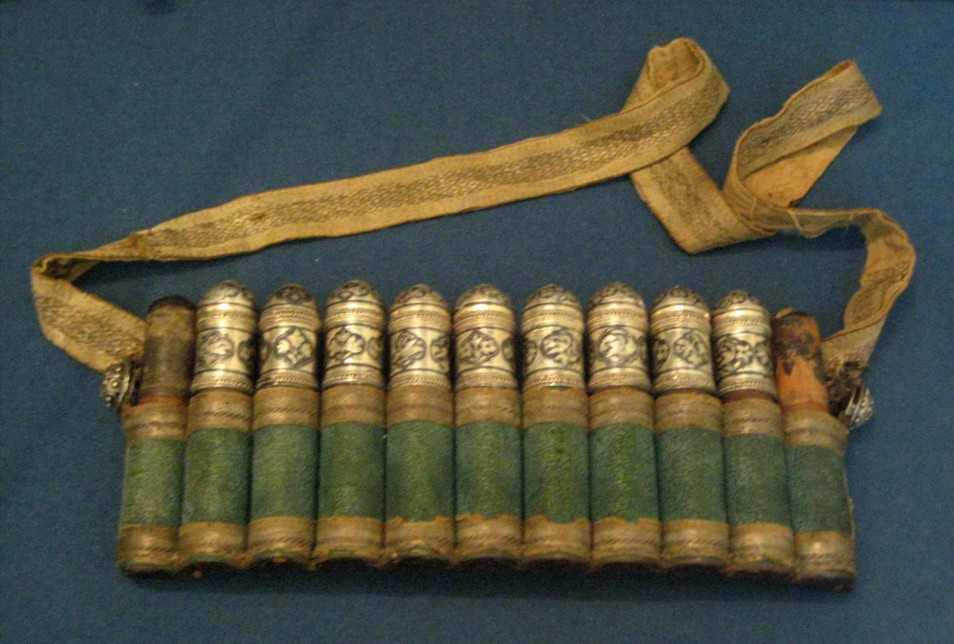
Caucasian cartridges of nielloed silver, Kubachi, 19th century

=== 20th century ===
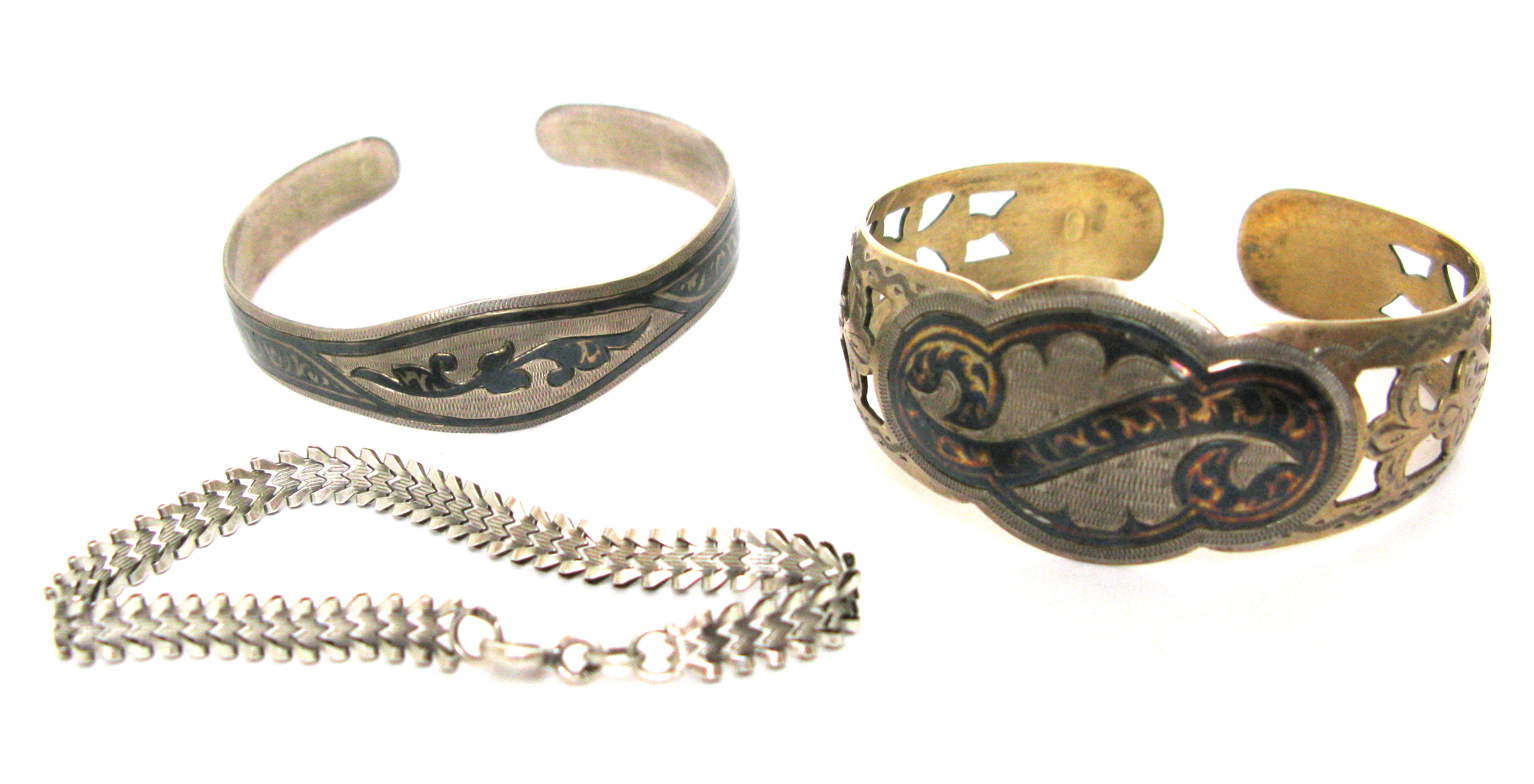
Kubachi-style silver bracelets with niello, c. 1970-1980

=== 21st century ===
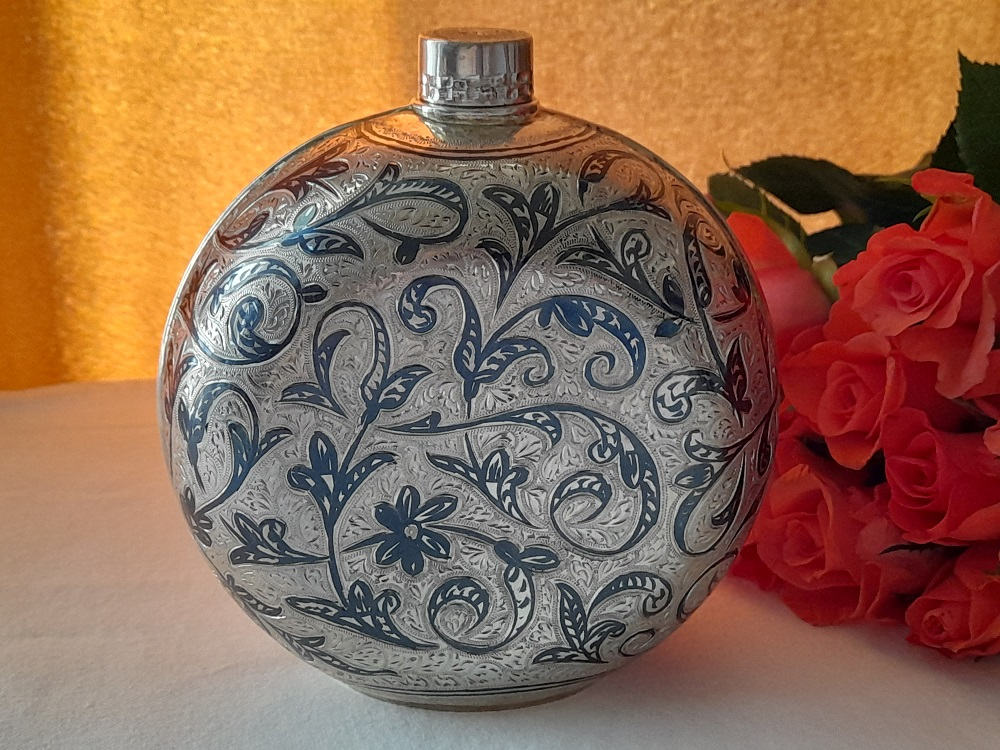
Engraved and nielloed hip flask of silver, c. 2020

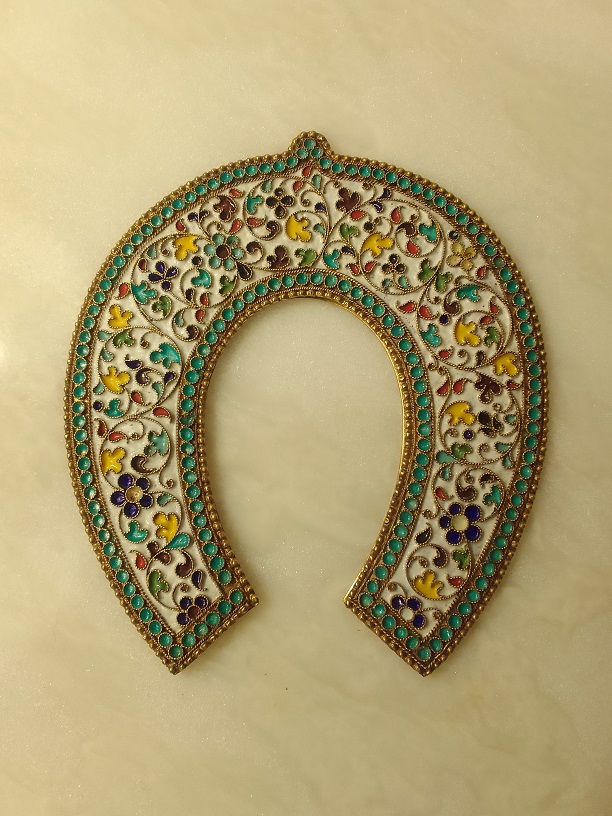
Horseshoe of silver and enamel, c. 2020

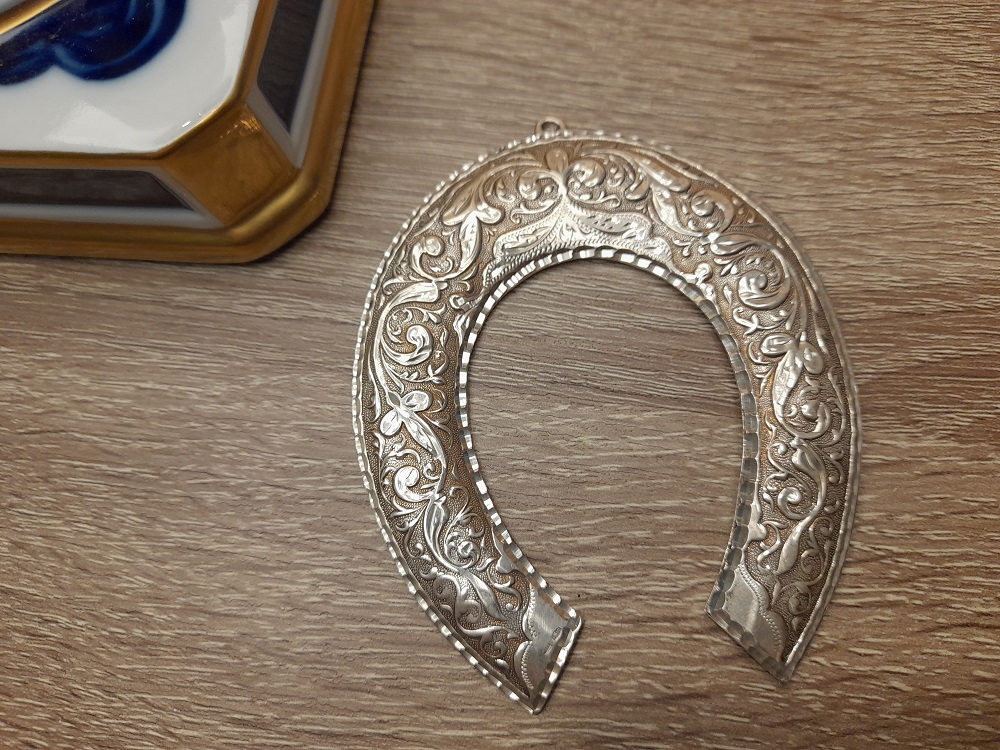
Horseshoe of silver, engraved, c. 2020

== See also ==
- Kubachi ware
- Isfahan
- Soviet jewelry

== Literature ==
- Freidgeim, Lazar. 'Sterling Niello Drinking Horns of Kubachi'. ASCAS. https://www.ascasonline.org/articoloFEBBRA179.html
- North, Anthony 1985. An Introduction to Islamic Arms London: HMSO.
