= Style (visual arts) =

Distinctive appearance of a creative work

La Vie by Pablo Picasso, 1903; falling under the "style label" of Picasso's Blue Period

Les Demoiselles d'Avignon (1907), also by Picasso in a different style ("Picasso's African Period") four years later

In the visual arts, style is a "distinctive manner which permits the grouping of works into related categories" or "any distinctive, and therefore recognizable, way in which an act is performed or an artifact made or ought to be performed and made". It refers to the visual appearance of a work of art that relates it to other works by the same artist or one from the same period, training, location, "school", art movement or archaeological culture: "The notion of style has long been the art historian's principal mode of classifying works of art. By style he selects and shapes the history of art".

Style is often divided into the general style of a period, country or cultural group, group of artists or art movement, and the individual style of the artist within that group style. Divisions within both types of styles are often made, such as between "early", "middle" or "late". In some artists, such as Picasso for example, these divisions may be marked and easy to see; in others, they are more subtle. Style is seen as usually dynamic, in most periods always changing by a gradual process, though the speed of this varies greatly, from the very slow development in style typical of prehistoric art or Ancient Egyptian art to the rapid changes in Modern art styles. Style often develops in a series of jumps, with relatively sudden changes followed by periods of slower development.

After dominating academic discussion in art history in the 19th and early 20th centuries, so-called "style art history" has come under increasing attack in recent decades, and many art historians now prefer to avoid stylistic classifications where they can.

== Overview ==
Any piece of art is in theory capable of being analysed in terms of style; neither periods nor artists can avoid having a style, except by complete incompetence, and conversely natural objects or sights cannot be said to have a style, as style only results from choices made by a maker. Whether the artist makes a conscious choice of style, or can identify his own style, hardly matters. Artists in recent developed societies tend to be highly conscious of their own style, arguably over-conscious, whereas for earlier artists stylistic choices were probably "largely unselfconscious".

Most stylistic periods are identified and defined later by art historians, but artists may choose to define and name their own style. The names of most older styles are the invention of art historians and would not have been understood by the practitioners of those styles. Some originated as terms of derision, including Gothic, Baroque, and Rococo. Cubism on the other hand was a conscious identification made by a few artists; the word itself seems to have originated with critics rather than painters, but was rapidly accepted by the artists.

Western art, like that of some other cultures, most notably Chinese art, has a marked tendency to revive at intervals "classic" styles from the past. In critical analysis of the visual arts, the style of a work of art is typically treated as distinct from its iconography, which covers the subject and the content of the work, though for Jas Elsner this distinction is "not, of course, true in any actual example; but it has proved rhetorically extremely useful".

== History of the concept ==
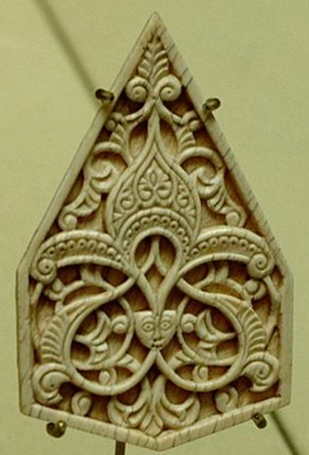
14th-century Islamic ornament in ivory, centred on a palmette; Alois Riegl's Stilfragen (1893) traced the evolution and transmission of such motifs.

Classical art-criticism and the relatively few medieval writings on aesthetics did not greatly develop a concept of style in art, or analysis of it, and though Renaissance and Baroque writers on art are greatly concerned with what modern scholars would call "style", they did not develop a coherent theory of it, at least outside architecture:

Artistic styles shift with cultural conditions; a self-evident truth to any modern art historian, but an extraordinary idea in this period [Early Renaissance and earlier]. Nor is it clear that any such idea was articulated in antiquity ... Pliny was attentive to changes in ways of art-making, but he presented such changes as driven by technology and wealth. Vasari, too, attributes the strangeness and, in his view the deficiencies, of earlier art to lack of technological know-how and cultural sophistication.

Giorgio Vasari (1511-1574) set out a hugely influential but much-questioned account of the development of style in Italian painting (mainly) from Giotto to his own Mannerist period. He stressed the development of a Florentine style based on disegno or line-based drawing, rather than on Venetian colour. With other Renaissance theorists like Leon Battista Alberti he continued classical debates over the best balance in art between the realistic depiction of nature and idealization of it; this debate would continue until the 19th century and the advent of Modernism.

The theorist of Neoclassicism, Johann Joachim Winckelmann, analysed the stylistic changes in Greek classical art in 1764, comparing them closely to the changes in Renaissance art, and "Georg Hegel codified the notion that each historical period will have a typical style", casting a very long shadow over the study of style. Hegel is often attributed with the invention of the German word Zeitgeist, but he never actually used the word, although in Lectures on the Philosophy of History, he uses the phrase der Geist seiner Zeit (the spirit of his time), writing that "no man can surpass his own time, for the spirit of his time is also his own spirit."

Constructing schemes of the period styles of historic art and architecture became a major concern of 19th-century scholars in the new and initially mostly German-speaking field of art history, with important writers on the broad theory of style including Carl Friedrich von Rumohr, Gottfried Semper, and Alois Riegl in his Stilfragen of 1893, with Heinrich Wölfflin and Paul Frankl continuing the debate in the 20th century. Paul Jacobsthal and Josef Strzygowski are among the art historians who followed Riegl in proposing grand schemes tracing the transmission of elements of styles across great ranges in time and space. This type of art history is also known as formalism, or the study of forms or shapes in art.

Semper, Wölfflin, and Frankl, and later Ackerman, had backgrounds in the history of architecture, and like many other terms for period-styles, "Romanesque" and "Gothic" were initially coined to describe architectural styles, where major changes between styles can be clearer and more easy to define, not least because style in architecture is easier to replicate by following a set of rules than style in figurative art such as painting. Terms originated to describe architectural periods were often subsequently applied to other areas of the visual arts, and then more widely still to music, literature and general culture.

In architecture, stylistic change often follows, and is made possible by, the discovery or adoption of new techniques or materials, such as the Gothic rib vault or modern construction with metal and reinforced concrete. A major area of debate in both art history and archaeology has been the extent to which stylistic change in other fields like painting or pottery is also a response to new technical possibilities, or whether new developments have their own impetus to develop (the Kunstwollen of Riegl), or to change in response to social and economic factors affecting patronage and the conditions of the artist, as current thinking tends to emphasize, using less rigid versions of Marxist art-history.

Although style was well-established as a central component of the historical analysis of art, seeing it as the over-riding factor in art history had fallen out of fashion by World War II, as other ways of looking at art started to develop, and a reaction against the emphasis on style arose; for Svetlana Alpers, "the normal invocation of style in art history is a depressing affair indeed". According to James Elkins "In the later 20th century criticisms of style were aimed at further reducing the Hegelian elements of the concept while retaining it in a form that could be more easily controlled". Meyer Schapiro, James Ackerman, Ernst Gombrich and George Kubler (The Shape of Time: Remarks on the History of Things, 1962) have made notable contributions to the debate, which has also drawn on wider developments in critical theory. In 2010 Jas Elsner put it more strongly: "For nearly the whole of the 20th century, style art history has been the indisputable king of the discipline, but since the revolutions of the seventies and eighties the king has been dead", though his article explores ways in which "style art history" remains alive, and his comment would hardly apply to archaeology.

The use of terms such as Counter-Maniera appears to be in decline, as impatience with such "style labels" grows among art historians. In 2000 Marcia B. Hall, a leading art-historian of 16th-century Italian painting and mentee of Sydney Joseph Freedberg (1914–1997), who invented the term, was criticised by a reviewer of her After Raphael: Painting in Central Italy in the Sixteenth Century for her "fundamental flaw" in continuing to use this and other terms, despite an apologetic "Note on style labels" at the beginning of the book and a promise to keep their use to a minimum.

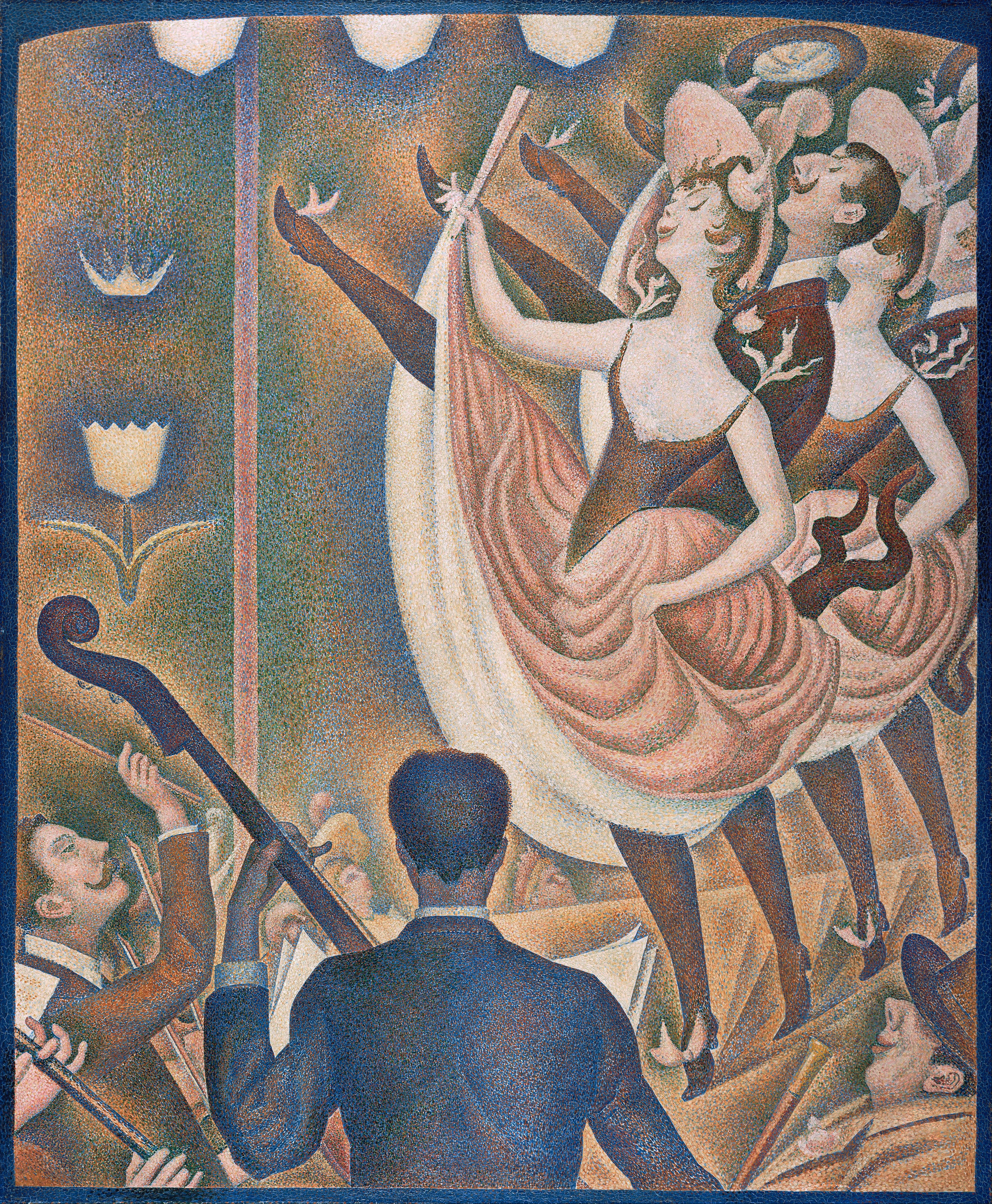
Georges Seurat's very individual technique and style, Le Chahut, 1889–90

A rare recent attempt to create a theory to explain the process driving changes in artistic style, rather than just theories of how to describe and categorize them, comes from the behavioural psychologist Colin Martindale, who has proposed an evolutionary theory based on Darwinian principles. However, this cannot be said to have gained much support among art historians.

== Individual style ==
Traditional art history has also placed great emphasis on the individual style, sometimes called the signature style, of an artist: "the notion of personal style—that individuality can be uniquely expressed not only in the way an artist draws, but also in the stylistic quirks of an author's writing (for instance)— is perhaps an axiom of Western notions of identity". The identification of individual styles is especially important in the attribution of works to artists, which is a dominant factor in their valuation for the art market, above all for works in the Western tradition since the Renaissance. The identification of individual style in works is "essentially assigned to a group of specialists in the field known as connoisseurs", a group who centre in the art trade and museums, often with tensions between them and the community of academic art historians.

The exercise of connoisseurship is largely a matter of subjective impressions that are hard to analyse, but also a matter of knowing details of technique and the "hand" of different artists. Giovanni Morelli (1816 – 1891) pioneered the systematic study of the scrutiny of diagnostic minor details that revealed artists' scarcely conscious shorthand and conventions for portraying, for example, ears or hands, in Western old master paintings. His techniques were adopted by Bernard Berenson and others, and have been applied to sculpture and many other types of art, for example by Sir John Beazley to Attic vase painting. Personal techniques can be important in analysing individual style. Though artists' training was before Modernism essentially imitative, relying on taught technical methods, whether learnt as an apprentice in a workshop or later as a student in an academy, there was always room for personal variation. The idea of technical "secrets" closely guarded by the master who developed them, is a long-standing topos in art history from Vasari's probably mythical account of Jan van Eyck to the secretive habits of Georges Seurat.

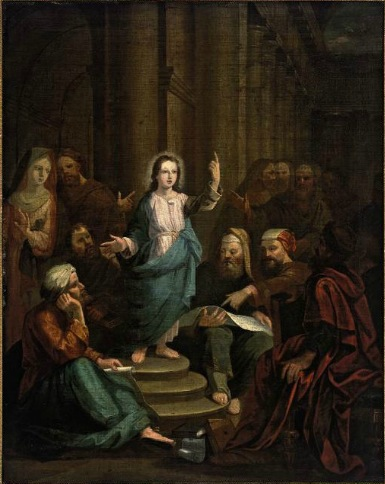
Painting of Christ among the Doctors, catalogued by Christie's as "Manner of Rembrandt Harmensz van Rijn" and sold for £750 in 2010

However the idea of personal style is certainly not limited to the Western tradition. In Chinese art it is just as deeply held, but traditionally regarded as a factor in the appreciation of some types of art, above all calligraphy and literati painting, but not others, such as Chinese porcelain; a distinction also often seen in the so-called decorative arts in the West. Chinese painting also allowed for the expression of political and social views by the artist a good deal earlier than is normally detected in the West. Calligraphy, also regarded as a fine art in the Islamic world and East Asia, brings a new area within the ambit of personal style; the ideal of Western calligraphy tends to be to suppress individual style, while graphology, which relies upon it, regards itself as a science.

The painter Edward Edwards said in his Anecdotes of Painters (1808): "Mr. Gainsborough's manner of penciling was so peculiar to himself, that his work needed no signature". Examples of strongly individual styles include: the Cubist art of Pablo Picasso, the Pop Art style of Andy Warhol, and Drip Painting by Jackson Pollock.

== Manner ==
"Manner" is a related term, often used for what is in effect a sub-division of a style, perhaps focused on particular points of style or technique. While many elements of period style can be reduced to characteristic forms or shapes, that can adequately be represented in simple line-drawn diagrams, "manner" is more often used to mean the overall style and atmosphere of a work, especially complex works such as paintings, that cannot so easily be subject to precise analysis. It is a somewhat outdated term in academic art history, avoided because it is imprecise. When used it is often in the context of imitations of the individual style of an artist, and it is one of the hierarchy of discreet or diplomatic terms used in the art trade for the relationship between a work for sale and that of a well-known artist, with "Manner of Rembrandt" suggesting a distanced relationship between the style of the work and Rembrandt's own style. The "Explanation of Cataloguing Practice" of the auctioneers Christie's' explains that "Manner of ..." in their auction catalogues means "In our opinion a work executed in the artist's style but of a later date". Mannerism, derived from the Italian maniera ("manner") is a specific phase of the general Renaissance style, but "manner" can be used very widely.

== Style in archaeology ==
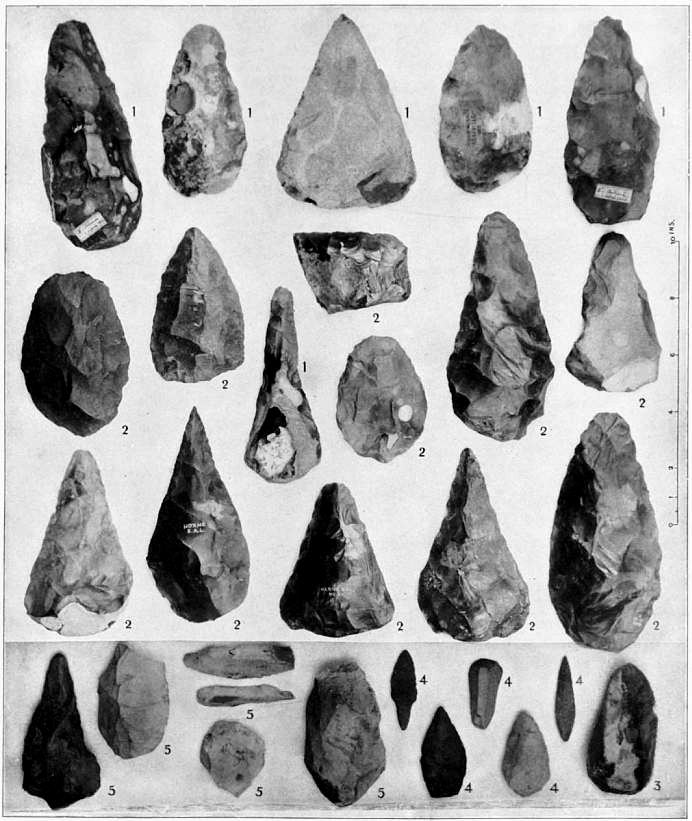
Paleolithic stone tools grouped by period

In archaeology, despite modern techniques like radiocarbon dating, period or cultural style remains a crucial tool in the identification and dating not only of works of art but all classes of archaeological artefact, including purely functional ones (ignoring the question of whether purely functional artefacts exist). The identification of individual styles of artists or artisans has also been proposed in some cases even for remote periods such as the Ice Age art of the European Upper Paleolithic.

As in art history, formal analysis of the morphology (shape) of individual artefacts is the starting point. This is used to construct typologies for different types of artefacts, and by the technique of seriation a relative dating based on style for a site or group of sites is achieved where scientific absolute dating techniques cannot be used, in particular where only stone, ceramic or metal artefacts or remains are available, which is often the case. Sherds of pottery are often very numerous in sites from many cultures and periods, and even small pieces may be confidently dated by their style. In contrast to recent trends in academic art history, the succession of schools of archaeological theory in the last century, from culture-historical archaeology to processual archaeology and finally the rise of post-processual archaeology in recent decades has not significantly reduced the importance of the study of style in archaeology, as a basis for classifying objects before further interpretation.

== Stylization ==
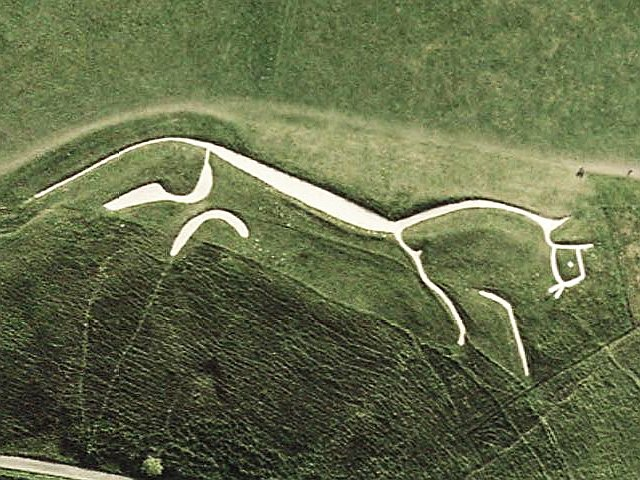
Aerial view of the very stylized prehistoric Uffington White Horse in England

Stylization and stylized (or stylisation and stylised in (non-Oxford) British English, respectively) have a more specific meaning, referring to visual depictions that use simplified ways of representing objects or scenes that do not attempt a full, precise and accurate representation of their visual appearance (mimesis or "realistic"), preferring an attractive or expressive overall depiction. More technically, it has been defined as "the decorative generalization of figures and objects by means of various conventional techniques, including the simplification of line, form, and relationships of space and color", and observed that "[s]tylized art reduces visual perception to constructs of pattern in line, surface elaboration and flattened space".

Ancient, traditional, and modern art, as well as popular forms such as cartoons or animation very often use stylized representations, so for example The Simpsons use highly stylized depictions, as does traditional African art. The two Picasso paintings illustrated at the top of this page show a movement to a more stylized representation of the human figure within the painter's style, and the Uffington White Horse is an example of a highly stylized prehistoric depiction of a horse. Motifs in the decorative arts such as the palmette or arabesque are often highly stylized versions of the parts of plants.

Even in art that is in general attempting mimesis or "realism", a degree of stylization is very often found in details, and especially figures or other features at a small scale, such as people or trees etc. in the distant background even of a large work. But this is not stylization intended to be noticed by the viewer, except on close examination. Drawings, modelli, and other sketches not intended as finished works for sale will also very often stylize.

=== Stylized name ===
"Stylized" may mean the adoption of any style in any context, and in American English is often used for the orthographic style of names (or other text), as in "AT&T is also stylized as ATT and at&t". (It should not be confused with style, the form of address related to one's name and position.) This is a specific usage that seems to have escaped dictionaries, although it is a small extension of existing other senses of the word. Some examples of this type of stylization are all caps and faux Cyrillic.

"Stylized" text may also refer to text rendered in a particular typographic style, such as blackletter or italics.

== Computer identification and recreation ==
In a 2012 experiment at Lawrence Technological University in Michigan, a computer analysed approximately 1,000 paintings from 34 well-known artists using a specially developed algorithm and placed them in similar style categories to human art historians. The analysis involved the sampling of more than 4,000 visual features per work of art.

Apps such as Deep Art Effects can turn photos into art-like images claimed to be in the style of painters such as Van Gogh. With the development of sophisticated text-to-image AI art software, using specifiable art styles has become a widespread tool in the 2020s.

== See also ==
- Artistic rendering
- Composition (visual arts)
- Mise en scène
- Posthumanist art
