= Posthuman =

Person or entity that exists in a state beyond being human

Posthuman or post-human is a concept originating in the fields of science fiction, futurology, contemporary art, and philosophy that means a person or entity that exists in a state beyond being human. The concept aims at addressing a variety of questions, including ethics and justice, language and trans-species communication, social systems, and the intellectual aspirations of interdisciplinarity.

Posthumanism is not to be confused with transhumanism (the biotechnological enhancement of human beings) and narrow definitions of the posthuman as the hoped-for transcendence of materiality. The notion of the posthuman comes up both in posthumanism as well as transhumanism, but it has a special meaning in each tradition.

== Posthumanism ==
In critical theory, the posthuman is a speculative being that represents or seeks to re-conceive the human. It is the object of posthumanist criticism, which critically questions humanism, a branch of humanist philosophy which claims that human nature is a universal state from which the human being emerges; human nature is autonomous, rational, capable of free will, and unified in itself as the apex of existence. Thus, the posthuman position recognizes imperfectability and disunity within oneself, and understands the world through heterogeneous perspectives while seeking to maintain intellectual rigor and dedication to objective observations. Key to this posthuman practice is the ability to fluidly change perspectives and manifest oneself through different identities. The posthuman, for critical theorists of the subject, has an emergent ontology rather than a stable one; in other words, the posthuman is not a singular, defined individual, but rather one who can "become" or embody different identities and understand the world from multiple, heterogeneous perspectives.

Approaches to posthumanism are not homogeneous, and have often been very critical. The term itself is contested, with one of the foremost authors associated with posthumanism, Manuel DeLanda, decrying the term as "very silly." Covering the ideas of, for example, Robert Pepperell's The Posthuman Condition, and Hayles's How We Became Posthuman under a single term is distinctly problematic due to these contradictions.

The posthuman is roughly synonymous with the "cyborg" of A Cyborg Manifesto by Donna Haraway. Haraway's conception of the cyborg is an ironic take on traditional conceptions of the cyborg that inverts the traditional trope of the cyborg whose presence questions the salient line between humans and robots. Haraway's cyborg is in many ways the "beta" version of the posthuman, as her cyborg theory prompted the issue to be taken up in critical theory. Following Haraway, Hayles, whose work grounds much of the critical posthuman discourse, asserts that liberal humanism—which separates the mind from the body and thus portrays the body as a "shell" or vehicle for the mind—becomes increasingly complicated in the late 20th and 21st centuries because information technology puts the human body in question. Hayles maintains that we must be conscious of information technology advancements while understanding information as "disembodied," that is, something which cannot fundamentally replace the human body but can only be incorporated into it and human life practices.

=== Post-posthumanism and post-cyborg ethics ===
The idea of post-posthumanism (post-cyborgism) has recently been introduced. This body of work outlines the after-effects of long-term adaptation to cyborg technologies and their subsequent removal, e.g., what happens after 20 years of constantly wearing computer-mediating eyeglass technologies and subsequently removing them, and of long-term adaptation to virtual worlds followed by return to "reality." and the associated post-cyborg ethics (e.g. the ethics of forced removal of cyborg technologies by authorities, etc.).

Posthuman political and natural rights have been framed on a spectrum with animal rights and human rights. Posthumanism broadens the scope of what it means to be a valued life form and to be treated as such (in contrast to certain life forms being seen as less-than and being taken advantage of or killed off); it “calls for a more inclusive definition of life, and a greater moral-ethical response, and responsibility, to non-human life forms in the age of species blurring and species mixing. … [I]t interrogates the hierarchic ordering—and subsequently exploitation and even eradication—of life forms.”

=== Hybrid interfaces: supersenses, cyborg systems, and hybrid bodies ===
Technology integrated into the human body changes how individuals interact with the external world. Sensory activity is mediated by technology, creating a new interface with the world. The introduction of nanotechnologies and hybrid computing into the organism alters the normal perception and cognition of things and the world. The fusion of the human body with technology within the organism lays the groundwork for the emergence of individuals endowed with new attributes and capabilities. Human beings and the modification of their psycho-physical characteristics become subjects of direct manipulation, necessitating a reevaluation of the concept of humanity from various humanistic, philosophical, and biological perspectives.

Human ability to incorporate inorganic elements of technological nature into oneself can radically alter both inner and outer appearance, transforming individuals into cyborgs. This new hybrid form replaces the humanistic view of humanity and raises a series of new philosophical questions concerning ethics and human nature.

Especially for new generations, the combination of carnal body and virtual body can determine forms of identity hybridization and possible negative effects on identity formation.

== Transhumanism ==
=== Definition ===
According to transhumanist thinkers, a posthuman is a hypothetical future being "whose basic capacities so radically exceed those of present humans as to be no longer, unambiguously, human by our current standards." Posthumans primarily focus on cybernetics, the posthuman consequent and the relationship to digital technology. Steve Nichols published the Posthuman Movement manifesto in 1988. His early evolutionary theory of mind (MVT) allows development of sentient E1 brains. The emphasis is on systems. Transhumanism does not focus on either of these. Instead, transhumanism focuses on the modification of the human species via any kind of emerging science, including genetic engineering, digital technology, and bioengineering. Transhumanism is sometimes criticized for not adequately addressing the scope of posthumanism and its concerns for the evolution of humanism.

=== Methods ===
Posthumans could be completely synthetic artificial intelligences, or a symbiosis of human and artificial intelligence, or uploaded consciousnesses, or the result of making many smaller but cumulatively profound technological augmentations to a biological human, i.e. a cyborg. Some examples of the latter are redesigning the human organism using advanced nanotechnology or radical enhancement using some combination of technologies such as genetic engineering, psychopharmacology, life extension therapies, neural interfaces, advanced information management tools, memory enhancing drugs, wearable or implanted computers, and cognitive techniques.

=== Posthuman future ===
As used in this article, "posthuman" does not necessarily refer to a conjectured future where humans are extinct or otherwise absent from the Earth. Kevin Warwick says that both humans and posthumans will continue to exist but the latter will predominate in society over the former because of their abilities. Recently, scholars have begun to speculate that posthumanism provides an alternative analysis of apocalyptic cinema and fiction, often casting vampires, werewolves, zombies and greys as potential evolutions of the human form and being. With these potential evolutions of humans and posthumans, human centered designed ways of thinking needs to also be inclusive of these new posthumans. The new "post human resists binary categories and, instead, integrates the human and the nonhuman." Human centered thinking needs to be redone in a way to include posthumanism.

Many science fiction authors, such as Greg Egan, H. G. Wells, Isaac Asimov, Bruce Sterling, Frederik Pohl, Greg Bear, Charles Stross, Neal Asher, Ken MacLeod, Peter F. Hamilton, Ann Leckie, and authors of the Orion's Arm Universe, have written works set in posthuman futures.

=== Posthuman god ===
A variation on the posthuman theme is the notion of a "posthuman god"; the idea that posthumans, being no longer confined to the parameters of human nature, might grow physically and mentally so powerful as to appear possibly god-like by present-day human standards. This notion should not be interpreted as being related to the idea portrayed in some science fiction that a sufficiently advanced species may "ascend" to a higher plane of existence—rather, it merely means that some posthuman beings may become so exceedingly intelligent and technologically sophisticated that their behaviour would not possibly be comprehensible to modern humans, purely by reason of their limited intelligence and imagination.

== Journal ==
In 2017, Penn State University Press in cooperation with Stefan Lorenz Sorgner and James Hughes established the Journal of Posthuman Studies, in which all aspects of the concept "posthuman" can be analysed.

== See also ==
- Body hacking
- Biopunk
- Kardashev scale
- Nanopunk
- Posthumanization
- Postcyberpunk
- Speculative evolution
- Technological singularity
- Web life
