= Soviet jewelry =

Jewelry produced in USSR between 1922 and 1991

Soviet jewelry consists of items for personal adornment produced in the Union of Soviet Socialist Republics (USSR) during its existence from 1922 to 1991.

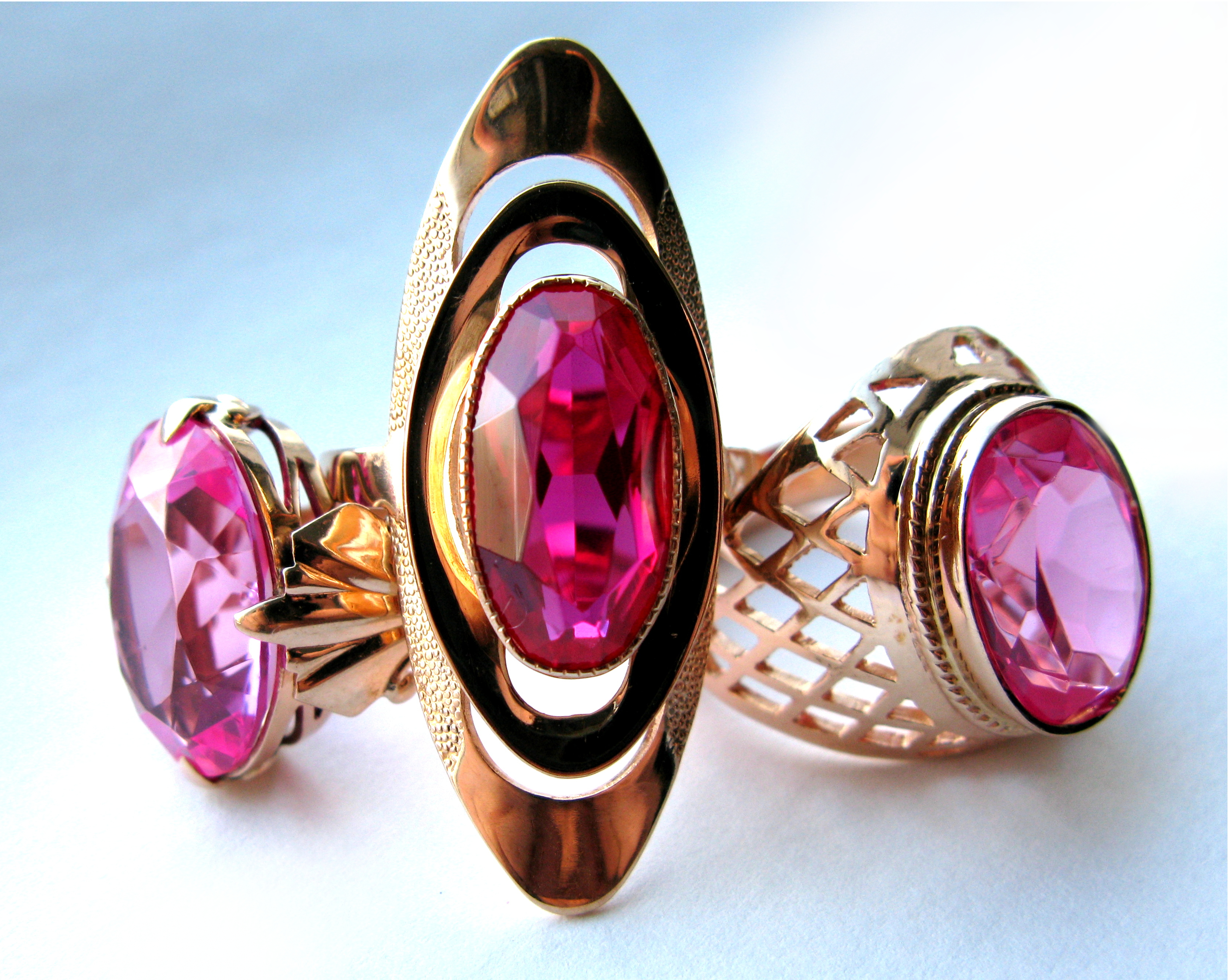
Soviet gold rings with rubies.

== Soviet gold jewelry ==
In the USSR, the most popular precious metal for use in jewelry was gold. It was produced in lesser numbers than silver jewelry but was the most desired metal by the Soviet public. The overwhelming majority of Soviet gold jewelry was of rose or red 14-karat gold (583 millesimal fineness). Although gold alloys of different colors and fineness were used in Soviet jewelry production, 583 millesimal fineness was the most popular choice.

== Soviet silver jewelry ==
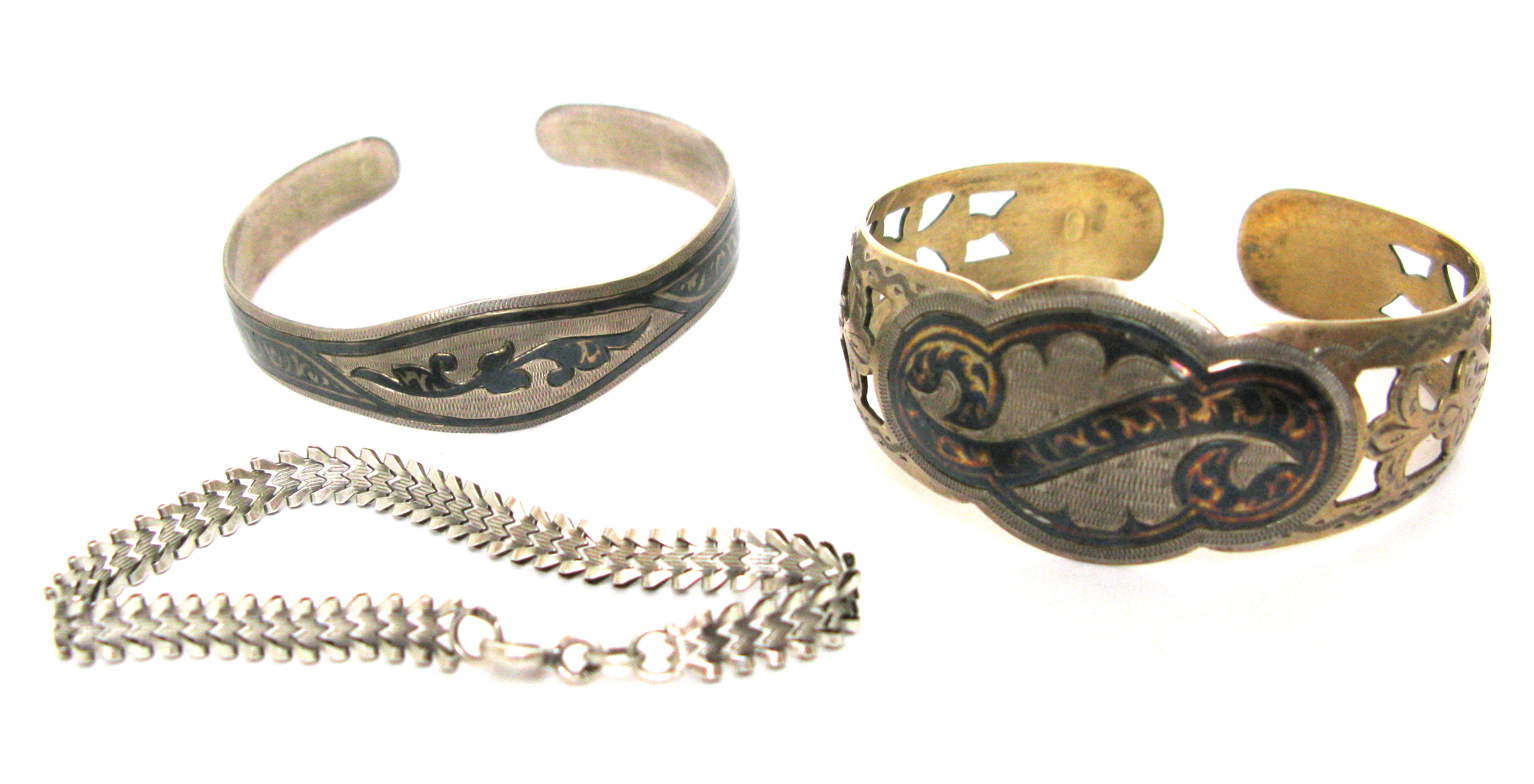
Kubachi-style Soviet silver bracelets

Silver jewelry was the most produced fine jewelry in the USSR. The most common millesimal fineness for silver jewelry was "875"..

== Soviet platinum and palladium jewelry ==
Platinum and palladium jewelry was not very common in USSR. These metals were reserved for recognized jewelry artists, jewelry intended for export or for limited production jewelry. Few of these items have survived.

== Classification ==
Soviet jewelry falls under the category of art, antiques and collectibles which are all grouped and defined as Movable Cultural Property. Although all Soviet jewelry can be called art, most of jewelry from USSR is considered to be collectibles and some, depending on the jurisdiction under which they are located, are (or soon to become) legitimate antiques.

== See also ==
- Kubachi silver
