= Journal of Posthuman Studies =

- Language: English
- Edited by: Stefan Lorenz Sorgner

Publication details
- History: 2017–present
- Publisher: Penn State University Press (United States)
- Frequency: Biannually

Standard abbreviations
- ISO 4: J. Posthuman Stud.

Indexing
- ISSN: 2472-4513 (print); 2471-4461 (web)
- JSTOR: 24724513
- OCLC no.: 2957004093

Links
- Journal homepage; Online archive

The Journal of Posthuman Studies is a biannual peer-reviewed academic journal published by the Penn State University Press and hosted by the Ewha Institute for the Humanities. Established in 2017, the journal seeks to address questions such as what it is to be human in this age of technological, scientific, cultural, and social evolution. Drawing on theories from critical posthumanism and transhumanism, the journal encourages constructive and critical dialogue through research articles, discussion papers, and forums.
