= Shannon Bell =

Canadian performance philosopher

- Born: 5 July 1955 (age 71)

Education
- Education: York University

Philosophical work
- Institutions: York University
- Main interests: Experimental philosophy
- Notable works: Reading, writing and rewriting the prostitute body. (Ph.D Thesis) (1992)

Shannon Bell (born 5 July 1955) is a Canadian performance philosopher who lives and writes philosophy-in-action, experimental philosophy. Bell is also professor and graduate programme director in the York University Political Science Department, Toronto, Ontario, Canada. She teaches postmodern theory, fast feminism, sexual politics, cyber politics, identity politics and violent philosophy.

== Research ==
Bell is researching extreme science and art for her book entitled Fast Bodies; this research is funded by Social Science and Humanities Research Council (SSHRC). Bell's most recent on-going research project Shooting Theory (2007–23) brings together digital video technology and print textual philosophy/theory through imaging philosophical/theoretical concepts such as Heidegger's stillness and Deleuze's deterritorialization. Bell's research also includes: applying continental and post-structural theory to bio, techno and performance artists' artwork and thinkers' body of work; aspects of sexuality; and, General Semantics.

== Bibliography ==
Books

- Bell, Shannon (1994). Reading, writing, and rewriting the prostitute body. Bloomington: Indiana University Press. ISBN 9780585000992.
- Bell, Shannon (1995). Whore carnival. Brooklyn, NY: Autonomedia. ISBN 9781570270222.
- Bell, Shannon; Cossman, Brenda; Gotell, Lise, eds. (1997). Bad attitude/s on trial: pornography, feminism, and the Butler decision. Toronto Buffalo: University of Toronto Press. ISBN 9781282045750.
- Bell, Shannon; Albritton, Robert; Bell, John R.; Westra, Richard, eds. (2004). New socialisms futures beyond globalization. London New York: Routledge. ISBN 9780203390894.
- Bell, Shannon (2010). Fast feminism. New York: Autonomedia. ISBN 9781570271892.
- Bell, Shannon; Kulchyski, Peter K., eds. (2013). Subversive itinerary: the thought of Gad Horowitz. Toronto: University of Toronto Press. ISBN 9781442645325.
- Gad Horowitz and Shannon Bell, eds (2016). The Book of Radical General Semantics (Delhi: Pencraft International) ISBN 9789382178170.

Co-authored Book

Brenda Cossman, Shannon Bell, Lise Gotell, Becki Ross (2017) Bad Attitude\s on Trial: Pornography, Feminism and the Butler Decision (Toronto: University of Toronto Press) [Republished in The Canadian 150 Collection].

Brenda Cossman, Shannon Bell, Lise Gotell, Becki Ross (1997) Bad Attitude\s on Trial: Pornography, Feminism and the Butler Decision (Toronto: University of Toronto Press).

== See also ==
- Posthumanism
