= Posthumanist art =

Posthumanist art refers to art that can only be created in some part through the aid of digital technology. Posthumanist art can be either human-conceived, or machine-produced in whole or in part. The extent to which the human element is involved in the creation, whether by direct manipulation of the technology, or by creation of the algorithm through which the art is created, can vary.
