= George Kubler =

American art historian (1912–1996)

George Alexander Kubler (July 26, 1912 – October 3, 1996) was an American art historian and among the foremost scholars on the art of pre-Columbian America and Ibero-American Art.

== Biography ==
Kubler was born in Hollywood, California, but most of his early education was in Europe. He attended high school at Western Reserve Academy, a private, coeducational boarding school in Hudson, Ohio. He then went to Yale University, where he earned an A.B. (1934), A.M. (1936) and Ph.D. degree (1940), the latter two under guidance of Henri Focillon. From 1938 onwards, Kubler was a member of the Yale University faculty and was the first Robert Lehman Professor (1964–1975), Sterling Professor of the History of Art (1975–1983) and after his retirement, a senior resident scholar. He received several awards, including three Guggenheim Fellowships, an American Council of Learned Societies Grant-in-Aid for research in Mexico and the Order of the Aztec Eagle by the Mexican Government. He also was honored with several visiting lectureships and honorary degrees and was appointed the 1985-86 Kress Professor at the Center for Advanced Studies at the National Gallery of Art in Washington, D.C. He was a member of both the American Academy of Arts and Sciences and the American Philosophical Society. He was awarded the William Clyde DeVane Medal in 1991.

Kubler's major theoretical work, The Shape of Time: Remarks on the History of Things was a major influence on David Summers, Esther Pasztory, Robert Smithson, Donald Judd, Ad Reinhardt, and Robert Morris, among others.

He also had a hand in the definition of "Portuguese plain architecture", naming this architectural period in light of his direct knowledge of a set of plain, simple buildings with almost no ornaments dating from the 16th century.

== Works ==
=== Books ===
- Mexican architecture of the sixteenth century. 2 vols. New Haven: Yale University Press 1948.
- The Tovar Calendar (with Charles Gibson. Mem. Connecticut Aca. Arts and Sci., vol. 11. New Haven 1951.
- The art and architecture of ancient America: the Mexican, Maya, and Andean Peoples. New York: Penguin 1962.
- The Shape of Time: Remarks on the History of Things. New Haven: Yale University Press 1962.
- Portuguese Plain Architecture: Between Spices and Diamonds 1521–1706 (1972)

=== Articles ===
- "Population movements in Mexico, 1520-1600." Hispanic American Historical Review, vol. 22(1942): 606–43
- "The Cycle of life and death in metropolitan Aztec Culture." Gazette des Beaux-Arts, 23(1943): 257–68.
- "Chichen-Itza y Tula." Estudios de Cultura Maya, 1:(1961) 47–80.
- "The iconography of the art of Teotihuacan: the pre-Columbian collection, Dumbarton Oaks. Studies in Pre-Columbiain Art and Archeologyl, no. 4. Washington, D.C. 1967.
