= Stefan Lorenz Sorgner =

German philosopher

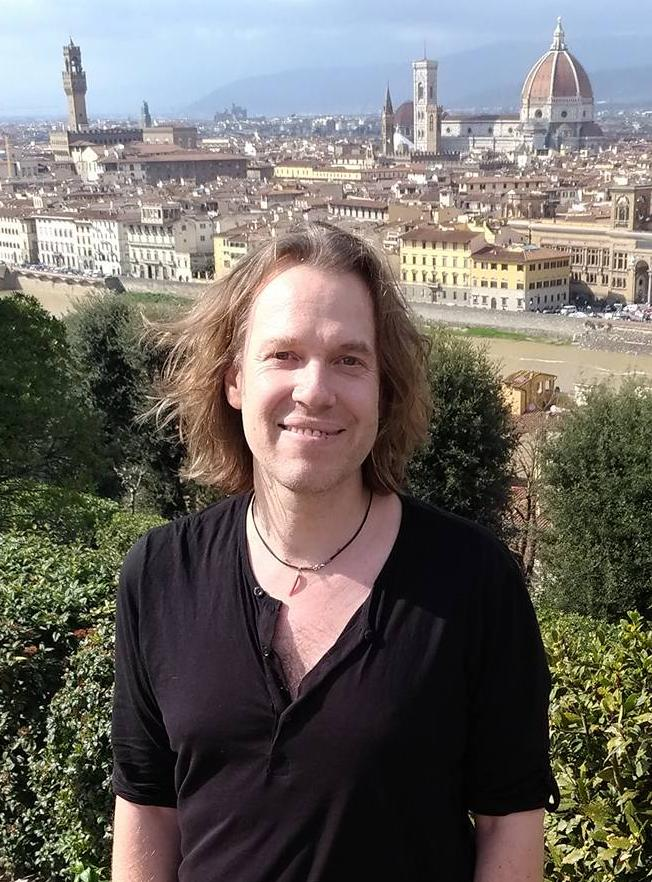
- Sorgner in 2015
- Born: 15 October 1973 (age 53); Wetzlar, West Germany

Education
- Education: King's College London; University of Durham; University of Jena

Philosophical work
- Era: 21st-century philosophy
- Region: Western philosophy
- School: Continental philosophy, transhumanism, posthumanism, philosophical naturalism
- Institutions: John Cabot University
- Website: www.sorgner.de

Stefan Lorenz Sorgner (born 15 October 1973) is a German philosopher whose main interests are transhumanism, posthumanism, and the ethics of emerging technologies. He is Professor of Philosophy at John Cabot University in Rome and the editor-in-chief and founding editor of the Journal of Posthuman Studies.

== Early life and education ==
Sorgner was born on 15 October 1973, in Wetzlar, West Germany. He studied philosophy at King's College London. He subsequently earned a master's degree by thesis at the University of Durham. He later completed his doctorate at the University of Jena, under the supervision of Wolfgang Welsch and Gianni Vattimo.

== Career and research ==
Sorgner's work focuses on contemporary philosophical issues related to posthumanism, transhumanism, and the ethics of emerging technologies.

Influenced by Friedrich Nietzsche, he has explored parallels between Nietzsche’s concept of the Übermensch and modern transhumanist thought. In 2009, Sorgner published an article in the Journal of Evolution and Technology arguing that Nietzsche’s Übermensch shares conceptual similarities with the posthuman figure in some strands of transhumanist theory. The article initiated a debate within both Nietzsche scholarship and the transhumanist community. A special issue of the journal, titled Nietzsche and European Posthumanisms, was later published to investigate these connections, with critical responses from figures including Max More.

Sorgner has also been challenged by Nick Bostrom, who has argued for a clearer separation between Nietzschean thought and contemporary transhumanism. In a follow-up article, Sorgner responded to these criticisms and further developed his philosophical stance on enhancement and self-overcoming.

Sorgner has also written extensively on the philosophical concept of human dignity. In his 2010 monograph Menschenwürde nach Nietzsche: Die Geschichte eines Begriffs (Human Dignity after Nietzsche: The History of a Concept), he examined the genealogy of the idea of human dignity from a Nietzschean perspective. He argued that dominant conceptions of human dignity are historically contingent and should not be treated as universally binding moral standards. This interpretation, which drew on a perspectivist comparison between liberal-democratic conceptions of dignity and ideologies associated with figures such as Adolf Hitler and Pol Pot, generated controversy. A symposium was organised by the Nietzsche Forum Munich in 2012 address the book’s central claims. Further responses appeared in the 2014 edited volume Umwertung der Menschenwürde (Transvaluation of Human Dignity), which brought together theologians, philosophers, and ethicists to critique Sorgner’s proposals.

In 2013, Sorgner was interviewed by the weekly newspaper Die Zeit, where he outlined his views on the ethical implications of human enhancement technologies and the philosophical foundations of transhumanism. He has also spoken at conferences such as phil.cologne, the World Humanities Forum, and TEDx events.

In 2021, Sorgner published We Have Always Been Cyborgs: Digital Data, Gene Technologies, and an Ethics of Transhumanism, in which he argues that human beings can be considered cyborgs insofar as they are shaped by governance, technological intervention, and education. The book advances what he terms “carbon-based transhuman technologies”—including gene editing and genetic selection—as ethically defensible tools of self-enhancement, comparable in moral structure to traditional education.
