= Posthumanism =

Class of philosophies

Posthumanism or post-humanism (meaning "after humanism" or "beyond humanism") is an idea in continental philosophy and critical theory responding to the presence of anthropocentrism in 21st-century thought.

In general, posthumanism looks closely at how humans relate to other creatures, technology, and the world around them. This way of thinking can lead to a more detailed and accurate idea of what it means to be human. It involves rethinking old ideas about right and wrong (ethics) and core beliefs (philosophy) to recognize that humans are connected to all life and systems, not just other people.

Posthumanism posits that choosing to see humans not beyond the influences of elements such as plants, animals, ecosystems, habitats and technology but a piece of the build itself. This includes our animal nature (biology), our connection to the environment (ecology), and the tools and extensions we or other natural forces create ( e.g. technology).

It also points out that we need to reconnect to a sense of care, duty, and modesty. The awareness - seeing non-human elements (Tech, animals, food, natural forces, plants, the strength and fragility of temperature related events) having an equal and active role in the world. After all, the aim of posthumanism is not to escape realities or choose any future or advise to rely only on tools or totally abandon them - instead, it seeks mindful understandings of a present and where all stands within it as well as how may it/we influence the future and how well can we prepare generations of harmonious existing.

== Challenges for Posthumanism ==
Posthumanism is a new way of thinking that arose because traditional views separating human from nonhuman are breaking down. For example, over time, every argument for human exceptionalism has disintegrated in the face of cognitively creative animal behavior. Posthumanism has emerged as a critical framework. It directly questions the primacy of the human such as in anthropocentrism, species-based discrimination such as in speciesism, and life-controlling structures such as in biopolitics. This conceptual shift has tangible effects, informing practices like bioart and digital literature, and causes institutional reform across the life sciences and theoretical disciplines. As our worldview is revised by digitalization, globalization, and technological augmentation, posthumanism offers the necessary alternative viewpoints to address the significant uncertainty that current technological, economic, and ecological challenges pose to human, nonhuman, and planetary existence.

== Philosophical posthumanism ==
Philosopher Theodore Schatzki suggests there are two varieties of posthumanism of the philosophical kind:

One, which he calls "objectivism", tries to counter the overemphasis of the subjective, or intersubjective, that pervades humanism, and emphasises the role of the nonhuman agents, whether they be animals and plants, or computers or other things, because "Humans and nonhumans, it [objectivism] proclaims, codetermine one another", and also claims "independence of (some) objects from human activity and conceptualization".

A second posthumanist agenda is "the prioritization of practices over individuals (or individual subjects)", which, they say, constitute the individual.

There may be a third kind of posthumanism, propounded by the philosopher Herman Dooyeweerd. Though he did not label it "posthumanism", he made an immanent critique of humanism, and then constructed a philosophy that presupposed neither humanist, nor scholastic, nor Greek thought but started with a different religious ground motive. Dooyeweerd prioritized law and meaningfulness as that which enables humanity and all else to exist, behave, live, occur, etc. "Meaning is the being of all that has been created", Dooyeweerd wrote, "and the nature even of our selfhood". Both human and nonhuman alike function subject to a common law-side, which is diverse, composed of a number of distinct law-spheres or aspects. The temporal being of both human and non-human is multi-aspectual; for example, both plants and humans are bodies, functioning in the biotic aspect, and both computers and humans function in the formative and lingual aspect, but humans function in the aesthetic, juridical, ethical and faith aspects too. The Dooyeweerdian version is able to incorporate and integrate both the objectivist version and the practices version, because it allows nonhuman agents their own subject-functioning in various aspects and places emphasis on aspectual functioning.

== Emergence of philosophical posthumanism ==
Ihab Hassan, theorist in the academic study of literature, once stated: "Humanism may be coming to an end as humanism transforms itself into something one must helplessly call posthumanism." This view predates most currents of posthumanism which have developed over the late 20th century in somewhat diverse, but complementary, domains of thought and practice. For example, Hassan is a known scholar whose theoretical writings expressly address postmodernity in society. Beyond postmodernist studies, posthumanism has been developed and deployed by various cultural theorists, often in reaction to problematic inherent assumptions within humanistic thought and Enlightenment thought.

Theorists who both complement and contrast Hassan include Michel Foucault, Judith Butler, cyberneticists such as Gregory Bateson, Warren McCullouch, Norbert Wiener, and thinkers such as Bruno Latour, Cary Wolfe, Elaine Graham, N. Katherine Hayles, Benjamin H. Bratton, Donna Haraway, Rosi Braidotti, Francesca Ferrando, Peter Sloterdijk, Stefan Lorenz Sorgner, Evan Thompson, Francisco Varela, Humberto Maturana, Timothy Morton, and Douglas Kellner. Among the theorists are philosophers, such as Robert Pepperell, who have written about a "posthuman condition", which is often substituted for the term posthumanism.

Posthumanism differs from classical humanism by relegating humanity back to one of many natural species, thereby rejecting any claims founded on anthropocentric dominance. According to this claim, humans have no inherent rights to destroy nature or set themselves above it in ethical considerations a priori. Human knowledge is also reduced to a less controlling position, previously seen as the defining aspect of the world. Human rights exist on a spectrum with animal rights and posthuman rights. The limitations and fallibility of human intelligence are confessed, even though it does not imply abandoning the rational tradition of humanism.

Proponents of a posthuman discourse, suggest that innovative advancements and emerging technologies have transcended the traditional model of the human, as proposed by Descartes among others associated with philosophy of the Enlightenment. Posthumanistic views were also found in the works of Shakespeare. In contrast to humanism, the discourse of posthumanism seeks to redefine the boundaries surrounding modern philosophical understanding of the human. Posthumanism represents an evolution of thought beyond that of the contemporary social boundaries and is predicated on the seeking of truth within a postmodern context. In so doing, it rejects previous attempts to establish "anthropological universals" that are imbued with anthropocentric assumptions. Recently, critics have sought to describe the emergence of posthumanism as a critical moment in modernity, arguing for the origins of key posthuman ideas in modern fiction, in Nietzsche, or in a modernist response to the crisis of historicity.

Although Nietzsche's philosophy has been characterized as posthumanist, Foucault placed posthumanism within a context that differentiated humanism from Enlightenment thought. According to Foucault, the two existed in a state of tension: as humanism sought to establish norms while Enlightenment thought attempted to transcend all that is material, including the boundaries that are constructed by humanistic thought. Drawing on the Enlightenment's challenges to the boundaries of humanism, posthumanism rejects the various assumptions of human dogmas (anthropological, political, scientific) and takes the next step by attempting to change the nature of thought about what it means to be human. This requires not only decentering the human in multiple discourses (evolutionary, ecological and technological) but also examining those discourses to uncover inherent humanistic, anthropocentric, normative notions of humanness and the concept of the human.

== Hayles's theory ==
Posthumanistic discourse aims to open up spaces to examine what it means to be human and critically question the concept of "the human" in light of current cultural and historical contexts. In her book How We Became Posthuman, N. Katherine Hayles, writes about the struggle between different versions of the posthuman as it continually co-evolves alongside intelligent machines. Such coevolution, according to some strands of the posthuman discourse, allows one to extend their subjective understandings of real experiences beyond the boundaries of embodied existence. According to Hayles's view of posthuman, often referred to as "technological posthumanism", visual perception and digital representations thus paradoxically become ever more salient. Even as one seeks to extend knowledge by deconstructing perceived boundaries, it is these same boundaries that make knowledge acquisition possible. The use of technology in a contemporary society is thought to complicate this relationship.

Hayles discusses the translation of human bodies into information (as suggested by Hans Moravec) in order to illuminate how the boundaries of our embodied reality have been compromised in the current age and how narrow definitions of humanness no longer apply. Because of this, according to Hayles, posthumanism is characterized by a loss of subjectivity based on bodily boundaries. This strand of posthumanism, including the changing notion of subjectivity and the disruption of ideas concerning what it means to be human, is often associated with Donna Haraway's concept of the cyborg. However, Haraway has distanced herself from posthumanistic discourse due to other theorists' use of the term to promote utopian views of technological innovation to extend the human biological capacity (even though these notions would more correctly fall into the realm of transhumanism).

While posthumanism is a broad and complex ideology, it has relevant implications today and for the future. It attempts to redefine social structures without inherently humanly or even biological origins, but rather in terms of social and psychological systems where consciousness and communication could potentially exist as unique disembodied entities. Questions subsequently emerge with respect to the current use and the future of technology in shaping human existence, as do new concerns with regards to language, symbolism, subjectivity, phenomenology, ethics, justice and creativity.

== Technological versus non-technological ==
Posthumanism can be divided into non-technological and technological forms.

=== Non-technological posthumanism ===
While posthumanization has links with the scholarly methodologies of posthumanism, it is a distinct phenomenon. The rise of explicit posthumanism as a scholarly approach is relatively recent, occurring since the late 1970s; however, some of the processes of posthumanization that it studies are ancient. For example, the dynamics of non-technological posthumanization have existed historically in all societies in which animals were incorporated into families as household pets or in which ghosts, monsters, angels, or semidivine heroes were considered to play some role in the world.

Such non-technological posthumanization has been manifested not only in mythological and literary works but also in the construction of temples, cemeteries, zoos, or other physical structures that were considered to be inhabited or used by quasi- or para-human beings who were not natural, living, biological human beings but who nevertheless played some role within a given society, to the extent that, according to philosopher Francesca Ferrando: "the notion of spirituality dramatically broadens our understanding of the posthuman, allowing us to investigate not only technical technologies (robotics, cybernetics, biotechnology, nanotechnology, among others), but also, technologies of existence."

=== Technological posthumanism ===
Some forms of technological posthumanization involve efforts to directly alter the social, psychological, or physical structures and behaviors of the human being through the development and application of technologies relating to genetic engineering or neurocybernetic augmentation; such forms of posthumanization are studied, e.g., by cyborg theory. Other forms of technological posthumanization indirectly "posthumanize" human society through the deployment of social robots or attempts to develop artificial general intelligences, sentient networks, or other entities that can collaborate and interact with human beings as members of posthumanized societies. N. Katherine Hayles' How We Became Posthuman, explores the changing perspectives and relationships between technology and information as a discourse on human society.

The dynamics of technological posthumanization have long been an important element of science fiction; genres such as cyberpunk take them as a central focus. In recent decades, technological posthumanization has also become the subject of increasing attention by scholars and policymakers. The expanding and accelerating forces of technological posthumanization have generated diverse and conflicting responses, with some researchers viewing the processes of posthumanization as opening the door to a more meaningful and advanced transhumanist future for humanity, while other bioconservative critiques warn that such processes may lead to a fragmentation of human society, loss of meaning, and subjugation to the forces of technology.

=== Common features ===
Processes of technological and non-technological posthumanization both tend to result in a partial "de-anthropocentrization" of human society, as its circle of membership is expanded to include other types of entities and the position of human beings is decentered. A common theme of posthumanist study is the way in which processes of posthumanization challenge or blur simple binaries, such as those of "human versus non-human", "natural versus artificial", "alive versus non-alive", and "biological versus mechanical".

== Relationship with transhumanism ==
Sociologist James Hughes comments that there is considerable confusion between the two terms. In the introduction to their book on post- and transhumanism, Robert Ranisch and Stefan Sorgner address the source of this confusion, stating that posthumanism is often used as an umbrella term that includes both transhumanism and critical posthumanism.

Although both subjects relate to the future of humanity, they differ in their view of anthropocentrism. Pramod Nayar, author of Posthumanism, states that posthumanism has two main branches: ontological and critical. Ontological posthumanism is synonymous with transhumanism. The subject is regarded as "an intensification of humanism". Transhumanist thought suggests that humans are not post human yet, but that human enhancement, often through technological advancement and application, is the passage of becoming post human. Transhumanism retains humanism's focus on the Homo sapiens as the center of the world but also considers technology to be an integral aid to human progression. Critical posthumanism, however, is opposed to these views. Critical posthumanism "rejects both human exceptionalism (the idea that humans are unique creatures) and human instrumentalism (that humans have a right to control the natural world)". These contrasting views on the importance of human beings are the main distinctions between the two subjects.

Transhumanism is also more ingrained in popular culture than critical posthumanism, especially in science fiction. The term is referred to by Pramod Nayar as "the pop posthumanism of cinema and pop culture".

== Varieties ==
Posthumanism encompasses a wide variety of branches, including:

- Antihumanism: a branch of theory that is critical of traditional humanism and traditional ideas about the human condition, vitality and agency.
- Ahumanism: A concept coined by Patricia McCormack that extends the critique of human centrality beyond traditional antihumanism. While antihumanism questions human exceptionalism, Ahumanism actively seeks to move “beyond the human” by focusing on the ethical, epistemological and aesthetic significance of non-human lifeforms
- Cultural posthumanism: A branch of cultural theory critical of the foundational assumptions of humanism and its legacy that examines and questions the historical notions of "human" and "human nature", often challenging typical notions of human subjectivity and embodiment and strives to move beyond "archaic" concepts of "human nature" to develop ones which constantly adapt to contemporary technoscientific knowledge.
- Philosophical posthumanism: A philosophical direction that draws on cultural posthumanism, the philosophical strand examines the ethical implications of expanding the circle of moral concern and extending subjectivities beyond the human species.
- Posthuman condition: The deconstruction of the human condition by critical theorists.
- Existential posthumanism: it embraces posthumanism as a praxis of existence. Its sources are drawn from non-dualistic global philosophies, such as Advaita Vedanta, Taoism and Zen Buddhism, the philosophies of Yoga, continental existentialism, native epistemologies and Sufism, among others. It examines and challenges hegemonic notions of being "human" by delving into the history of embodied practices of being human and, thus, expanding the reflection on human nature.
- Posthuman transhumanism: A transhuman ideology and movement which, drawing from posthumanist philosophy, seeks to develop and make available technologies that enable immortality and greatly enhance human intellectual, physical, and psychological capacities in order to achieve a "posthuman future". A variant of transhumanism is known as AI takeover, where humans will not be enhanced, but rather eventually replaced by artificial intelligences.
- Posthumanization comprises "those processes by which a society comes to include members other than 'natural' biological human beings who, in one way or another, contribute to the structures, dynamics, or meaning of the society."

== Criticism ==
Some critics have argued that all forms of posthumanism, including transhumanism, have more in common than their respective proponents realize. Linking these different approaches, Paul James suggests that "the key political problem is that, in effect, the position allows the human as a category of being to flow down the plughole of history":

This is ontologically critical. Unlike the naming of 'postmodernism' where the 'post' does not infer the end of what it previously meant to be human (just the passing of the dominance of the modern) the posthumanists are playing a serious game where the human, in all its ontological variability, disappears in the name of saving something unspecified about us as merely a motley co-location of individuals and communities.

However, some posthumanists in the humanities and the arts are critical of transhumanism (the brunt of James's criticism), in part, because they argue that it incorporates and extends many of the values of Enlightenment humanism and classical liberalism, namely scientism, according to performance philosopher Shannon Bell:

Altruism, mutualism, humanism are the soft and slimy virtues that underpin liberal capitalism. Humanism has always been integrated into discourses of exploitation: colonialism, imperialism, neoimperialism, democracy, and of course, American democratization. One of the serious flaws in transhumanism is the importation of liberal-human values to the biotechno enhancement of the human. Posthumanism has a much stronger critical edge attempting to develop through enactment new understandings of the self and others, essence, consciousness, intelligence, reason, agency, intimacy, life, embodiment, identity and the body.

While many modern leaders of thought are accepting of nature of ideologies described by posthumanism, some are more skeptical of the term. Haraway, the author of A Cyborg Manifesto, has outspokenly rejected the term, though acknowledges a philosophical alignment with posthumanism. Haraway opts instead for the term of companion species, referring to nonhuman entities with which humans coexist.

Questions of race, some argue, are suspiciously elided within the "turn" to posthumanism. Noting that the terms "post" and "human" are already loaded with racial meaning, critical theorist Zakiyyah Iman Jackson argues that the impulse to move "beyond" the human within posthumanism too often ignores "praxes of humanity and critiques produced by black people", including Frantz Fanon, Aime Cesaire, Hortense Spillers and Fred Moten. Interrogating the conceptual grounds in which such a mode of "beyond" is rendered legible and viable, Jackson argues that it is important to observe that "blackness conditions and constitutes the very nonhuman disruption and/or disruption" which posthumanists invite. In other words, given that race in general and blackness in particular constitute the very terms through which human-nonhuman distinctions are made, for example in enduring legacies of scientific racism, a gesture toward a "beyond" actually "returns us to a Eurocentric transcendentalism long challenged". Posthumanist scholarship, due to characteristic rhetorical techniques, is also frequently subject to the same critiques commonly made of postmodernist scholarship in the 1980s and 1990s.

In the 2020s, the Catholic Church and Holy See addressed the philosophy of transhumanism and posthumanism in documents including Quo vadis, humanitas? written by the International Theological Commission and the papal encyclical Magnifica humanitas.

== See also ==
- Bioconservatism
- Cyborg anthropology
- Posthuman
- Posthumanist art
- Superhuman
- Technological change
- Technological transitions
- Transhumanism
