= Real-time locating system =

Tracking system

Real-time locating systems (RTLS), also known as real-time tracking systems, are used to automatically identify and track the location of objects or people in real time, usually within a building or other contained area. Wireless RTLS tags are attached to objects or worn by people, and in most RTLS, fixed reference points receive wireless signals from tags to determine their location. Examples of real-time locating systems include tracking automobiles with a vehicle tracking system through an assembly line, locating pallets of merchandise in a warehouse, or finding medical equipment in a hospital.

The physical layer of RTLS technology is often radio frequency (RF) communication. Some systems use optical (usually infrared) or acoustic (usually ultrasound) technology with, or in place of RF, RTLS tags. And fixed reference points can be transmitters, receivers, or both resulting in numerous possible technology combinations.

RTLS are a form of local positioning system and do not usually refer to GPS or to mobile phone tracking. Location information usually does not include speed, direction, or spatial orientation.

== Origin ==
The term RTLS was created (circa 1998) at the ID EXPO trade show by Tim Harrington (WhereNet), Jay Werb (PinPoint), and Bert Moore (Automatic Identification Manufacturers, Inc., AIM). It was created to describe and differentiate an emerging technology that not only provided the automatic identification capabilities of active RFID tags, but also added the ability to view the location on a computer screen. It was at this show that the first examples of a commercial radio based RTLS system were shown by PinPoint and WhereNet. Although this capability had been utilized previously by military and government agencies, the technology had been too expensive for commercial purposes. In the early 1990s, the first commercial RTLS were installed at three healthcare facilities in the United States and were based on the transmission and decoding of infrared light signals from actively transmitting tags. Since then, new technology has emerged that also enables RTLS to be applied to passive tag applications.

== Locating concepts ==
RTLS are generally used in indoor and/or confined areas, such as buildings, and do not provide global coverage like GPS. RTLS tags are affixed to mobile items, such as equipment or personnel, to be tracked or managed. RTLS reference points, which can be either transmitters or receivers, are spaced throughout a building (or similar area of interest) to provide the desired tag coverage. In most cases, the more RTLS reference points that are installed, the better the location accuracy, until the technology limitations are reached.

A number of disparate system designs are all referred to as "real-time locating systems". Two primary system design elements are locating at choke points and locating in relative coordinates.

=== Locating at choke points ===
The simplest form of choke point locating is where short range ID signals from a moving tag are received by a single fixed reader in a sensory network, thus indicating the location coincidence of reader and tag. Alternately, a choke point identifier can be received by the moving tag and then relayed, usually via a second wireless channel, to a location processor. Accuracy is usually defined by the sphere spanned with the reach of the choke point transmitter or receiver. The use of directional antennas, or technologies such as infrared or ultrasound that are blocked by room partitions, can support choke points of various geometries.

=== Locating in relative coordinates ===
ID signals from a tag are received by a multiplicity of readers in a sensory network, and a position is estimated using one or more locating algorithms, such as trilateration, multilateration, or triangulation. Equivalently, ID signals from several RTLS reference points can be received by a tag and relayed back to a location processor. Localization with multiple reference points requires that distances between reference points in the sensory network be known in order to precisely locate a tag, and the determination of distances is called ranging.

Another way to calculate relative location is via mobile tags communicating with one another. The tag(s) will then relay this information to a location processor.

=== Location accuracy ===
RF trilateration uses estimated ranges from multiple receivers to estimate the location of a tag. RF triangulation uses the angles at which the RF signals arrive at multiple receivers to estimate the location of a tag. Many obstructions, such as walls or furniture, can distort the estimated range and angle readings leading to varied qualities of location estimate. Estimation-based locating is often measured in accuracy for a given distance, such as 90% accurate for 10-meter range.

Some systems use locating technologies that can't pass through walls, such as infrared or ultrasound. These require line of sight (or near line of sight) to communicate properly. As a result, they tend to be more accurate in indoor environments.

== Applications ==
RTLS can be used in numerous logistical or operational areas to:

- locate and manage assets within a facility, such as locating a misplaced tool cart in a warehouse or medical equipment in a hospital
- create notifications when an object moves, such as an alert if a tool cart left the facility
- combine identity of multiple items placed in a single location, such as on a pallet
- locate customers, for example in a restaurant, for delivery of food or service
- maintain proper staffing levels of operational areas, such as ensuring guards are in the proper locations in a correctional facility
- quickly and automatically account for all staff after or during an emergency evacuation
- Toronto General Hospital is looking at RTLS to reduce quarantine times after an infectious disease outbreak. After a recent SARS outbreak, 1% of all staff were quarantined. With RTLS, they would have more accurate data regarding who had been exposed to the virus, potentially reducing the need for quarantines.
- aid in process improvement efforts by automatically tracking and time stamping the progress of people or assets through a process, such as following a patient's emergency room wait time, time spent in the operating room, and total time until discharge
- help in healthcare provision through staff and patient monitoring and delivering the right equipment for use in certain situations as the technology eliminates long hours of storing manual reports, calling, locating staff and equipment
- aid in acute care capacity management through clinical-care locating
- provide Wayfinding for guests in a facility, like hospitals and stadiums
- prevent Child abduction by sounding alerts or alarms if an infant leaves the boundary of a hospital's Birthing center
- support mining operations by tracking personnel and mobile equipment in underground or surface mines, improving safety, asset utilization, and emergency response

== Privacy concerns ==
RTLS may be seen as a threat to privacy when used to determine the location of people. The newly declared human right of informational self-determination gives the right to prevent one's identity and personal data from being disclosed to others and also covers disclosure of locality, though this does not generally apply to the workplace.

Several prominent labor unions have spoken out against the use of RTLS systems to track workers, calling them "the beginning of Big Brother" and "an invasion of privacy".

Current location-tracking technologies can be used to pinpoint users of mobile devices in several ways. First, service providers have access to network-based and handset-based technologies that can locate a phone for emergency purposes. Second, historical location can frequently be discerned from service provider records. Thirdly, other devices such as Wi-Fi hotspots or IMSI catchers can be used to track nearby mobile devices in real time. Finally, hybrid positioning systems combine different methods in an attempt to overcome each individual method's shortcomings.

== Types of technologies used ==
There is a wide variety of systems concepts and designs to provide real-time locating.

- Active radio frequency identification (Active RFID)
- Active radio frequency identification - infrared hybrid (Active RFID-IR)
- Infrared (IR)
- Optical locating
- Low-frequency signpost identification
- Semi-active radio frequency identification (semi-active RFID)
- Passive RFID RTLS locating via steerable phased array antennae
- Radio beacon
- Ultrasound Identification (US-ID)
- Ultrasonic ranging (US-RTLS)
- Ultra-wideband (UWB)
- Wide-over-narrow band
- Wireless local area network (WLAN, Wi-Fi)
- Bluetooth
- Clustering in noisy ambience
- Bivalent systems

A general model for selection of the best solution for a locating problem has been constructed at the Radboud University of Nijmegen. Many of these references do not comply with the definitions given in international standardization with ISO/IEC 19762-5 and ISO/IEC 24730-1. However, some aspects of real-time performance are served and aspects of locating are addressed in context of absolute coordinates.

== Ranging and angulating ==
Depending on the physical technology used, at least one and often some combination of ranging and/or angulating methods are used to determine location:

- Angle of arrival (AoA)
- Angle of departure (AoD) (e.g., Bluetooth direction finding features a mobile-centric RTLS architecture - see US 7376428 B1)
- Line of sight (LoS)
- Time of arrival (ToA)
- Multilateration (Time difference of arrival) (TDoA)
- Time of flight (ToF)
- Two-way ranging (TWR) according to Nanotron's patents
- Symmetrical double-sided two-way ranging (SDS-TWR)
- Near-field electromagnetic ranging (NFER)

== Errors and accuracy ==
Real-time locating is affected by a variety of errors. Many of the major reasons relate to the physics of the locating system, and may not be reduced by improving the technical equipment.

None or no direct response

Many RTLS systems require direct and clear line of sight visibility. For those systems, where there is no visibility from mobile tags to fixed nodes there will be no result or a non valid result from locating engine. This applies to satellite locating as well as other RTLS systems such as angle of arrival and time of arrival. Fingerprinting is a way to overcome the visibility issue: If the locations in the tracking area contain distinct measurement fingerprints, line of sight is not necessarily needed. For example, if each location contains a unique combination of signal strength readings from transmitters, the location system will function properly. This is true, for example, with some Wi-Fi based RTLS solutions. However, having distinct signal strength fingerprints in each location typically requires a fairly high saturation of transmitters.

False location

The measured location may appear entirely faulty. This is a generally result of simple operational models to compensate for the plurality of error sources. It proves impossible to serve proper location after ignoring the errors.

Locating backlog

Real time is no registered branding and has no inherent quality. A variety of offers sails under this term. As motion causes location changes, inevitably the latency time to compute a new location may be dominant with regard to motion. Either an RTLS system that requires waiting for new results is not worth the money or the operational concept that asks for faster location updates does not comply with the chosen system's approach.

Temporary location error

Location will never be reported exactly, as the term real-time and the term precision directly contradict in aspects of measurement theory as well as the term precision and the term cost contradict in aspects of economy. That is no exclusion of precision, but the limitations with higher speed are inevitable.

Steady location error

Recognizing a reported location steadily apart from physical presence generally indicates the problem of insufficient over-determination and missing of visibility along at least one link from resident anchors to mobile transponders. Such effect is caused also by insufficient concepts to compensate for calibration needs.

Location jitter

Noise from various sources has an erratic influence on stability of results. The aim to provide a steady appearance increases the latency contradicting to real time requirements.

Location jump

As objects containing mass have limitations to jump, such effects are mostly beyond physical reality. Jumps of reported location not visible with the object itself generally indicate improper modeling with the location engine. Such effect is caused by changing dominance of various secondary responses.

Location creep

Location of residing objects gets reported moving, as soon as the measures taken are biased by secondary path reflections with increasing weight over time. Such effect is caused by simple averaging and the effect indicates insufficient discrimination of first echoes.

== Standards ==
=== ISO/IEC ===
The basic issues of RTLS are standardized by the International Organization for Standardization and the International Electrotechnical Commission under the ISO/IEC 24730 series. In this series of standards, the basic standard ISO/IEC 24730-1 identifies the terms describing a form of RTLS used by a set of vendors but does not encompass the full scope of RTLS technology.

Currently several standards are published:

- ISO/IEC 19762-5:2008 Information technology — Automatic identification and data capture (AIDC) techniques — Harmonized vocabulary—Part 5: Locating systems
- ISO/IEC 24730-1:2014 Information technology — Real-time locating systems (RTLS) — Part 1: Application programming interface (API)
- ISO/IEC 24730-2:2012 Information technology — Real time locating systems (RTLS) — Part 2: Direct Sequence Spread Spectrum (DSSS) 2,4 GHz air interface protocol
- ISO/IEC 24730-5:2010 Information technology — Real-time locating systems (RTLS) — Part 5: Chirp spread spectrum (CSS) at 2,4 GHz air interface
- ISO/IEC 24730-21:2012 Information technology — Real time locating systems (RTLS) — Part 21: Direct Sequence Spread Spectrum (DSSS) 2,4 GHz air interface protocol: Transmitters operating with a single spread code and employing a DBPSK data encoding and BPSK spreading scheme
- ISO/IEC 24730-22:2012 Information technology — Real time locating systems (RTLS) — Part 22: Direct Sequence Spread Spectrum (DSSS) 2,4 GHz air interface protocol: Transmitters operating with multiple spread codes and employing a QPSK data encoding and Walsh offset QPSK (WOQPSK) spreading scheme
- ISO/IEC 24730-61:2013 Information technology — Real time locating systems (RTLS) — Part 61: Low rate pulse repetition frequency Ultra Wide Band (UWB) air interface
- ISO/IEC 24730-62:2013 Information technology — Real time locating systems (RTLS) — Part 62: High rate pulse repetition frequency Ultra Wide Band (UWB) air interface

These standards do not stipulate any special method of computing locations, nor the method of measuring locations. This may be defined in specifications for trilateration, triangulation, or any hybrid approaches to trigonometric computing for planar or spherical models of a terrestrial area.

=== INCITS ===
- INCITS 371.1:2003, Information Technology - Real Time Locating Systems (RTLS) - Part 1: 2.4 GHz Air Interface Protocol
- INCITS 371.2:2003, Information Technology - Real Time Locating Systems (RTLS) - Part 2: 433-MHz Air Interface Protocol
- INCITS 371.3:2003, Information Technology - Real Time Locating Systems (RTLS) - Part 3: Application Programming Interface

== Limitations and further discussion ==
In RTLS application in the healthcare industry, various studies were issued discussing the limitations of the currently adopted RTLS. Currently used technologies RFID, Wi-fi, UWB, all RFID based are hazardous in the sense of interference with sensitive equipment. A study carried out by Dr Erik Jan van Lieshout of the Academic Medical Centre of the University of Amsterdam published in JAMA (Journal of the American Medical Equipment) claimed "RFID and UWB could shut down equipment patients rely on" as "RFID caused interference in 34 of the 123 tests they performed". The first Bluetooth RTLS provider in the medical industry is supporting this in their article: "The fact that RFID cannot be used near sensitive equipment should in itself be a red flag to the medical industry". The RFID Journal responded to this study not negating it rather explaining real-case solution: "The Purdue study showed no effect when ultrahigh-frequency (UHF) systems were kept at a reasonable distance from medical equipment. So placing readers in utility rooms, near elevators and above doors between hospital wings or departments to track assets is not a problem". However the case of ”keeping at a reasonable distance” might be still an open question for the RTLS technology adopters and providers in medical facilities.

In many applications it is very difficult and at the same time important to make a proper choice among various communication technologies (e.g., RFID, WiFi, etc.) which RTLS may include. Wrong design decisions made at early stages can lead to catastrophic results for the system and a significant loss of money for fixing and redesign. To solve this problem a special methodology for RTLS design space exploration was developed. It consists of such steps as modelling, requirements specification, and verification into a single efficient process.

== See also ==
- Automatic vehicle location
- Context awareness
- Electronic tagging
- Fleet telematics system
- Indoor positioning system
- Intelligent transportation system
- Location awareness
- Positioning technologies
- Track and trace
- Vehicle tracking system
- Wireless triangulation
