= Carol Breckenridge =

American anthropologist (1942–2009)

Carol A. Breckenridge (1942–2009) was an American anthropologist and associate professor of history at the New School for Social Research, author of many books and articles on colonialism and the political economy of ritual; state, polity, and religion in South India; society and aesthetics in India since 1850; culture theory; and cosmopolitan cultural forms. In 1988 Breckenridge and fellow founding editor Arjun Appadurai started Public Culture, a field-defining academic journal in the areas of globalization and transnational cultural studies.

Breckenridge received her Ph.D. from the University of Wisconsin–Madison in 1976 and formerly taught in the Department of South Asian Languages and Civilizations at the University of Chicago. She died of cancer on October 4, 2009. Her husband is the anthropologist Arjun Appadurai.

== Recent publications ==
- (Co-edited with Peter van der Veer) Orientalism and the Postcolonial Predicament (Philadelphia: University of Pennsylvania Press, 1993)
- (Editor) Consuming Modernity: Public Culture in a South Asian World (Minneapolis: University of Minnesota Press, 1995)
- (with Arjun Appadurai), "Public Modernity in India," in Consuming Modernity: Public Culture in a South Asian World, C.A. Breckenridge (Editor), Minneapolis: University of Minnesota Press, 1995.
- The Aesthetics and Politics of Colonial Collecting: India at World Fairs, Comparative Studies in Society and History, Spring 1989, 195–216.
