= BT Voyager =

Series of modems

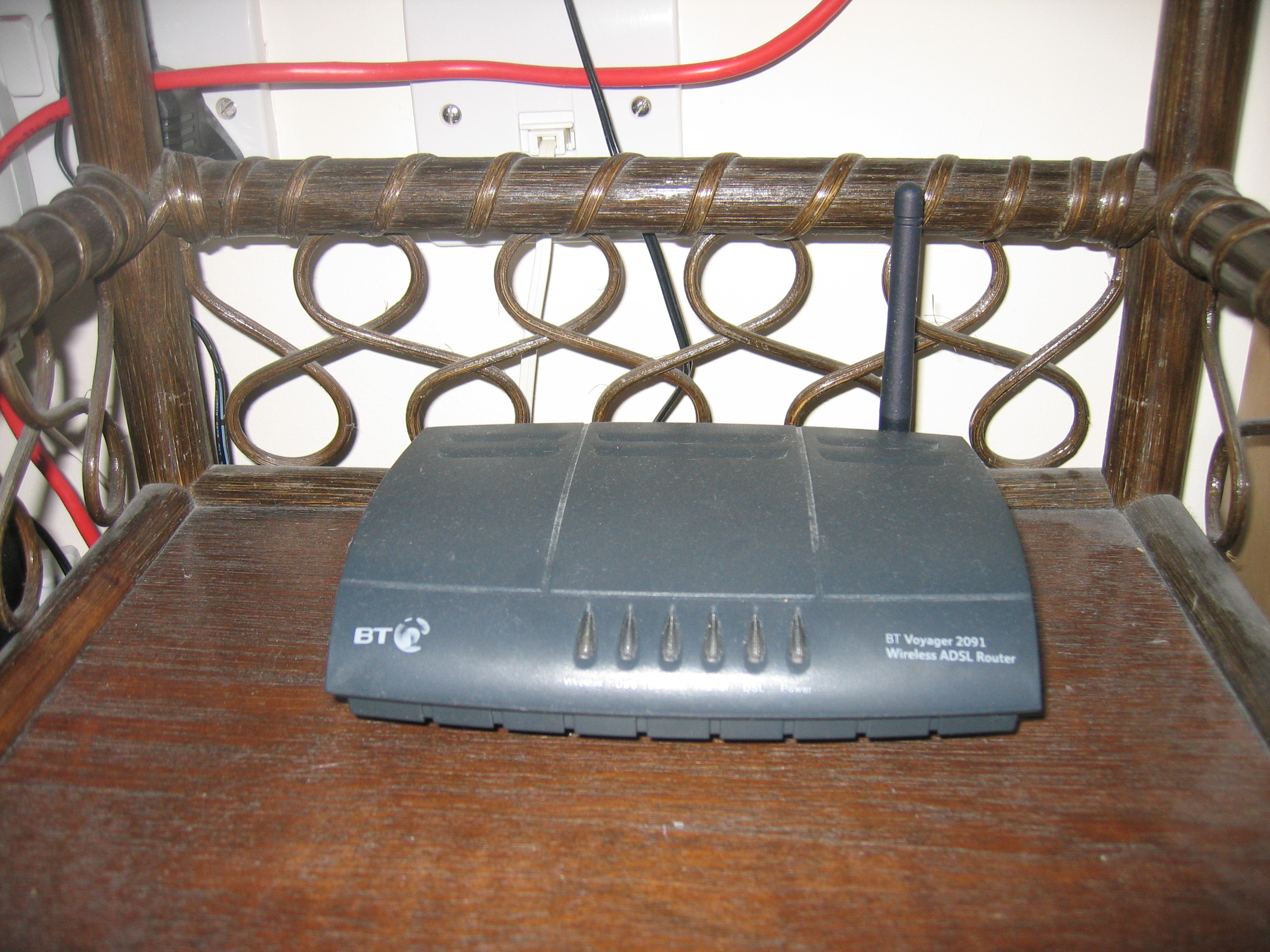
- BT Voyager 2091 wireless modem pictured in 2017
- Developer: BT Group
- Type: ADSL Modem
- Website: www.voyager.bt.com

The BT Voyager series is a series of ADSL modems supplied by British Telecommunications plc. Several models include WiFi, routing and voice over IP capabilities.

== Modems ==
BT entered the wireless ADSL modem market with the Voyager 2000 product in February 2003. The Voyager 2000 was based around a Globespan Virata chipset, offering 802.11b wireless capability to the end user. BT also sold Voyager 1010 USB and Voyager 1020 card wireless connectors for desktop and laptop computers alongside the 2000. The Voyager 2000 would be replaced by the Voyager 2100, which featured improved 802.11g wireless capability and four Ethernet ports. The 2100 was superseded by the BT Voyager 2110 in April 2005, which claimed 30% faster speeds.

== Other Devices ==
BT also utilised the Voyager branding for the BT Voyager Digital Media Player, released in 2004. The device was designed to look like a traditional radio, connected to a wireless base station that plugged into a PC allowing the device to connect to global radio stations.
