= Sentient computing =

Form of ubiquitous computing

Sentient computing is a form of ubiquitous computing which uses sensors to perceive its environment and react accordingly. A common use of the sensors is to construct a world model which allows location-aware or context-aware applications to be constructed.

One famous research prototype of a sentient computing system was the work at AT&T Laboratories, Cambridge (now defunct). It consisted of an ultrasonic indoor location system called the "Active Bats" which provided a location accuracy of about 3 cm. The world model was managed via the SPIRIT database, using CORBA to access information and spatial indexing to deliver high-level events such as "Alice has entered the kitchen" to listening context-aware applications. The research continues at the Digital Technology Group at the University of Cambridge.

Some example applications of the system include:

- A "follow-me phone" which would cause the telephone nearest the recipient to ring.
- Teleporting desktops via VNC just by clicking their Active Bat near the computer.
- Spatial buttons which were activated by clicking the Active Bat at a particular spot (such as a poster).
- Measuring and surveying buildings.
- Location-based games

== Context adaptation ==
A context adaptive system typically enables the user to maintain a certain application (in different forms) while roaming between different wireless access technologies, locations, devices and even simultaneously executing everyday tasks like meetings, driving a car etc. For example a context adaptive and hence ubiquitous navigation system would offer navigation support in the situations at home, indoor, outdoor, and in car. This involves making the navigation functionality available for different availability of output devices, input devices and location sensors as well as adapting the user interaction operability to the current speed, noise or operator handicaps while keeping in mind the overall applicability depending on the user preferences, his knowledge, current task etc.

== See also ==
- Home automation
- Mobile computing
- mscape
- Ubiquitous computing
