= Andy Hopper =

British computer scientist (born 1953)

Sir Andy Hopper CBE FRS FIET FREng
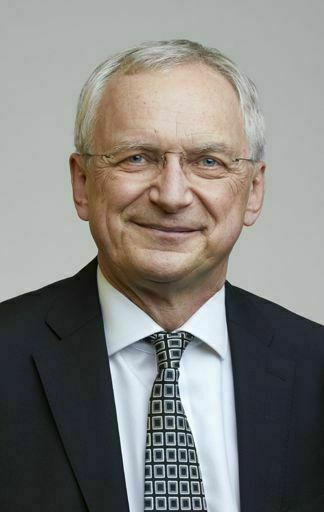
- Hopper in 2017
- Born: Andrew Hopper; 9 May 1953 (age 73); Warsaw, Poland
- Education: Swansea University (BSc); University of Cambridge (PhD)
- Known for: Acorn Computers; Active Badge; Virata Corporation; Virtual Network Computing; RealVNC
- Spouse: Alison Gail Smith (m. 1988)
- Awards: Fellow of the Institution of Engineering and Technology (1989); Fellow of the Royal Academy of Engineering (1996); Mountbatten Medal (2004); Fellow of the Royal Society (2006); CBE (2007); MacRobert Award (2013); Bakerian Medal (2017)
- Scientific career
- Fields: Computer Technology
- Workplaces: University of Cambridge; Swansea University
- Thesis: Local area computer communications networks (1978)
- Doctoral advisor: David Wheeler
- Doctoral students: Andy Harter
- Website: www.cl.cam.ac.uk/~ah12

Sir Andrew Hopper (born 9 May 1953) is a British-Polish computer technologist and entrepreneur. He is a founding partner at Cambridge AI Venture Partners and since 2025 has been chairman of CommonAI Community Interest Company and CommonAI Compute Ltd. He is also commissioner of the Royal Commission for the Exhibition of 1851, former treasurer and vice-president of the Royal Society, professor emeritus of computer technology at the University of Cambridge, an honorary fellow of Trinity Hall, Cambridge and Corpus Christi College, Cambridge.

== Education ==
Hopper was educated at Quintin Kynaston School in London after which he went to study for a Bachelor of Science degree at Swansea University before going to the University of Cambridge Computer Laboratory and Trinity Hall, Cambridge in 1974 for postgraduate work. Hopper was awarded his PhD in 1978 for research into local area computer communications networks supervised by David Wheeler.

== Research and career ==
Hopper's PhD, completed in 1977 was in the field of communications networks, and he worked with Maurice Wilkes on the creation of the Cambridge Ring and its successors.

Hopper's interests include computer networks, multimedia systems, Virtual Network Computing, sentient computing and ubiquitous data. His most cited paper describes the indoor location system called the Active Badge. He has contributed to a discussion of the privacy challenges relating to surveillance. He is a proponent of Digital Commons industrial and societal infrastructure.

After more than 20 years at Cambridge University Computer Laboratory, Hopper was elected Chair of Communications Engineering at Cambridge University Engineering Department in 1997. He returned to the Computer Laboratory as Professor of Computer Technology and Head of department in 2004.

Hopper's research under the title Computing for the Future of the Planet examines the uses of computers, data and AI for assuring the sustainability of the planet.

Hopper has supervised approximately fifty PhD students. An annual PhD studentship has been named after him.

=== Commercial activities ===
In 1978, Hopper co-founded Orbis Ltd to develop networking technologies. He worked with Hermann Hauser and Chris Curry, founders of Acorn Computers Ltd. Orbis became a division of Acorn in 1979 and continued to work with the Cambridge Ring. While at Acorn, Hopper contributed to design some of the chips for the BBC Micro and helped conceive the project which led to the design of the ARM microprocessor. When Acorn was acquired by Olivetti in 1985, Hauser became vice-president for research at Olivetti, in which role he co-founded the Olivetti Research Laboratory in 1986 with Hopper; Hopper became its managing director.

In 1985, after leaving Acorn, Hopper co-founded Qudos, a company producing CAD software and doing chip prototyping. He remained a director until 1989.

In 1993, Hopper set up Advanced Telecommunication Modules Ltd with Hermann Hauser. This company went public on the NASDAQ as Virata in 1999. The company was acquired by Conexant Systems on 1 March 2004.

In 1995, Hopper co-founded Telemedia Systems, now called IPV, and was its chairman until 2003.

In 1997, Hopper co-founded Adaptive Broadband Ltd (ABL) to further develop the 'Wireless ATM' project started at ORL in the early 90s. ABL was bought by California Microwave, Inc in 1998.

In January 2000, Hopper co-founded Cambridge Broadband which was to develop broadband fixed wireless equipment; he was non-executive chairman from 2000 – 2005.

In 2002 Hopper was involved in the founding of Ubisense Ltd to further develop the location technologies and sentient computing concepts that grew out of the ORL Active Badge system. Hopper became a director in 2003 and was chairman between 2006 and 2015 during which the company made its initial public offering (IPO) in June 2011.

In 2002, Hopper co-founded RealVNC and served as chairman until the company was sold in 2021.

In 2002, Hopper co-founded Level 5 Networks and was a director until 2008, just after it merged with Solarflare.

From 2005 until 2009, Hopper was chairman of Adventiq, a joint venture between Adder and RealVNC, developing a VNC-based system-on-a-chip.

In 2013 Hopper co-founded TxtEz, a company looking to commoditise B2C communication in Africa.

Between 2019 and 2026 he was Chairman of lowRISC Community Interest Company which develops industrial-strength open source hardware.

Hopper was an advisor to Hauser's venture capital firm Amadeus Capital Partners from 2001 until 2005. He was also an advisor to the Cambridge Gateway Fund from 2001 until 2006.

=== Awards and honours ===
Hopper is a Fellow of the Institution of Engineering and Technology (FIET) and was a Trustee from 2003 until 2006, and again between 2009 and 2013. In 2004, Hopper was awarded the Mountbatten Medal of the IET (then IEE). He served as president of the IET between 2012 and 2013.

Hopper was elected a Fellow of the Royal Academy of Engineering in 1996 and awarded their silver medal in 2003. He was a member of the Council of the Royal Academy of Engineering from 2007 to 2010. In 2013, he was part of the RealVNC team to receive the MacRobert Award.

In 1999, Hopper gave the Royal Society's Clifford Paterson Lecture on Progress and research in the communications industry published under the title Sentinent Computing and was thus awarded the society's bronze medal for achievement. In May 2006, he was elected a Fellow of the Royal Society. He was a member of the Council of the Royal Society between 2009 and 2011. In 2017, Hopper become treasurer and vice-president of the Royal Society and was awarded the Bakerian Lecture and Prize.

In the 2007 New Year Honours, Hopper was made an CBE for services to the computer industry.

In 2004, Hopper was awarded the Association for Computing Machinery's SIGMOBILE Outstanding Contribution Award and in 2016 the Test-of-Time Award for the Active Badge paper.

In July 2005, Hopper was awarded an Honorary Fellowship of Swansea University.

In 2010 Hopper was awarded an Honorary Degree from Queen's University Belfast.

In 2011 Hopper was elected as member of the Council and Trustee of the University of Cambridge and a member of the Finance Committee.

Hopper serves on several academic advisory boards. In 2005, he was appointed to the advisory board of the Institute of Electronics Communications and Information Technology at Queen's University Belfast. In 2008 he joined the advisory board of the Department of Computer Science, University of Oxford. In 2011 he was appointed a member of the advisory board of the School of Computer and Communication Sciences at the École Polytechnique Fédérale de Lausanne.

Since 2018 he has been a Commissioner of the Royal Commission for the Exhibition of 1851.

He was knighted in the 2021 Birthday Honours for services to computer technology.

== Personal life ==
Hopper married Alison Gail Smith, Professor of Plant Biochemistry at the University of Cambridge, in 1988. They have two children, William and Merrill. He is a qualified pilot with over 6,000 hours logged, including a round the world flight, and his house near Cambridge has an airstrip from which he flies his six-seater Cessna light aircraft.
