= Location awareness =

Location awareness refers to devices that can determine their location. Navigational instruments provide location coordinates for vessels and vehicles. Surveying equipment identifies location with respect to a well-known location wireless communications device.

The term applies to navigating, real-time locating, and positioning support with global, regional or local scope. The term has been applied to traffic, logistics, business administration, and leisure applications. Location awareness is supported by navigation systems, positioning systems, and/or locating services.

Location awareness without the active participation of the device is known as non-cooperative locating or detection.

== History of terminology ==
The term originated for configurations settings of network systems, and addressed network entities. Network location awareness (NLA) services collect network configuration and location information, and notify applications when this information changes. With the advent of global navigation satellite systems (GNSS) and radio-equipped mobile devices, the term was redefined to include consumer-focused applications.

While location awareness began as a matter of static user location, the notion was extended to reflect movement. Context models have been proposed to support context-aware applications which use location to tailor interfaces, refine application-relevant data, increase the precision of information retrieval, discover services, make user interaction implicit and build smart environments. For example, a location-aware mobile phone may confirm that it is currently in a building.

== Determining location ==
Description in logical terms uses a structured textual form. International standardisation offers a common method using ISO/TS 16952 as originated with German standards DIN EN 61346 and DIN EN 81346.

Location in mathematical terms offers coordinates that refer to a nominated point of reference.

Location in network terms relates to locating network nodes. These include:

- ITU switched line access addressing according to International Telecommunication Union Q-Series standards, Telecommunications Signalling System No. 7 (SS7) and mirroring ANSI Standards T1.110—General Information and subsequent standards.
- IEEE media access addressing according to MAC International standard ISO/IEC 10038 with ISO/IEC 11802 and ANSI/IEEE edition.
- ISO procedure call addressing according to URN/UUID International standards ISO/IEC 11578 and ISO/IEC 9834 and IETF RFC 4122.

== Variants ==
"Crisp" locating offers precise coordinates, using wireless signals or optical sighting, possibly with phase angle measurements. Coordinates are relative to either a standardized system of coordinates, e.g., WGS84, or a fixed object such as a building plan. Real-time locating adds timely delivery of results, especially for moving targets. Real time locating is defined with ISO/IEC 19762-5 and ISO/IEC 24730-1. Fuzzy locating offers less precision, e.g., presence "near" a point of reference. Measuring wireless power levels can supply this degree of precision. Less sophisticated systems can use wireless distance measurements to estimate a point of reference in polar coordinates (distance and direction) from another site. Index locating indicates presence at a known location, as with fixed RFID reader's and RFID tags.

== Applications ==
Location-aware systems address the acquisition of coordinates in a grid (for example using distance metrics and lateration algorithms) or at least distances to reference points (for example discriminating presence at a certain choke point on a corridor or in a room of a building).

=== Navigation ===
Navigation and reckoning are key concerns for seafarers, aviators and professional drivers. The task is to dynamically determine the current location and the time, distance and direction to destination. radar served for regional demand and NAVSTAR satellite systems for global demand. Global navigation satellite systems (GNSS) have become ubiquitous in long-haul transport operation and are becoming a standard automobile feature.

=== Surveying ===
Surveying is the static complement to navigating. It is essential for delineating land ownership and for architects and civil engineers designing construction projects. Optical surveying technology preceded laser triangulating aids.

=== Business process ===
Currently location awareness is applied to design innovative process controls, and is integral to ubiquitous and wearable computing. On mobile devices, location aware search can prioritize results that are close to the device. Conversely, the device location can be disclosed to others, at some cost to the bearer's privacy.

=== Warehouse and routing ===
RFID provides a time/location reference for an object, but does not indicate that the object remains at that location, which is sufficient for applications that limit access, such as tracking objects entering and leaving a warehouse, or for objects moving on a fixed route, such as charging tolls for crossing a bridge.

=== Consumer ===
Location awareness enables new applications for ubiquitous computing systems and mobile phones. Such applications include the automatic reconfiguration of a computing device to suit the location in which it is currently being used (examples include ControlPlane and Locamatic), or publishing a user's location to appropriate members of a social network, and allowing retailers to publish special offers to potential customers who are near to the retailers. Allegedly, individuals gain self confidence with confirmation of current whereabouts.

== Infrastructure ==
While governments have created global systems for computing locations, independent localized systems exist at scales ranging from one building to sub-national regions.

=== Local ===
Such solutions may apply concepts of real-time locating system (RTLS) and wireless personal area network (WPAN), wireless LAN or DECT, with results in proprietary terms of floor plans or room numbers. Local systems degrade as distance from the locality increases. Applications include the automatic reconfiguration of a computing device to suit the location in which it is currently being used.

=== Regional ===
This approach uses for example mobile phone systems, such as 3GPP, GSM or LTE, typically returning information in standardized coordinates as with WGS84 in standardized formats such as National Marine Electronics Association (NMEA) for outdoor usage or in symbolic coordinates referring to street addresses.

=== Global ===
This approach relies on global navigation satellite system (GNSS) technology generally adopting WGS84 and NMEA. Applications include avalanche rescue or emergency and mountain rescue as well as UAVs which are commonly used in search and rescue, (SAR) and combat search and rescue (CSAR).

== Network location awareness ==
Network location awareness (NLA) describes the location of a node in a network.

== See also ==
- Context adaptation
- Context awareness
- Context-aware pervasive systems
- Differentiated service (design pattern)
- Multilateration
- Pager
- Transreality gaming
- Location-based service
- Spatial contextual awareness
