= Near-field electromagnetic ranging =

Near-field electromagnetic ranging (NFER) refers to any radio technology employing the near-field properties of radio waves as a Real Time Location System (RTLS).

== Overview ==
Near-field electromagnetic ranging is an emerging RTLS technology that employs transmitter tags and one or more receiving units. Operating within a half-wavelength of a receiver, transmitter tags must use relatively low frequencies (less than 30 MHz) to achieve significant ranging. Depending on the choice of frequency, NFER has the potential for range resolution of 30 cm (12 in) and ranges up to 300 m (980 ft).

== Technical Discussion ==
The phase relations between the EH components of an electro-magnetic field ((E and H are the components E=electric and H=magnetic)) vary with distance around small antennas. This was first discovered by Heinrich Hertz and is formulated with Maxwell's field theory.

Close to a small antenna, the electric and magnetic field components of a radio wave are 90 degrees out of phase. As the distance from the antenna increases, the EH phase difference decreases. Far from a small antenna in the far-field, the EH phase difference goes to zero. Thus a receiver that can separately measure the electric and magnetic field components of a near-field signal and compare their phases can measure the range to the transmitter.

=== Advantages ===
NFER technology is a different approach for locating systems. It has several inherent advantages over other RTLS systems.

- First, no signal modulation is required, so baseband signals with an arbitrarily small bandwidth may be used for ranging.
- Second, precise synchronization is not required between different receivers: in fact, a local range measurement can be made with just a single receiver.
- Third, since EH phase differences are preserved when a signal is down-converted to baseband, high range precision may be achieved with relatively low time precision.

For instance, a radio wave at 1 MHz has a period of 1 μs, and the EH phase difference changes about 45 degrees between 30 m (98 ft) to 60 m (200 ft). Thus, a 1 degree EH phase difference in a 1 MHz signal corresponds to a range difference of about 67 cm (26 in) and 1/360 of the period or 27.78 ns difference in time between the electric and magnetic signals. Down-converted to a 1 kHz audio signal, the period becomes 1 ms, and the time difference required to measure becomes 27.78 μs. A comparable time-of-flight (TOF) or Time difference of arrival (TDOA) system would require 2 ns to 4 ns to make the same measurement.

Using relatively low frequencies also conveys additional advantages. First, low frequencies are generally more penetrating than higher frequencies. For instance, at 2.4 GHz a reinforced concrete wall might attenuate signals as much as 20 dB. Second, the long wavelengths associated with low frequencies are far less vulnerable to multipath. In dense metallic structures, multipath obscures or destroys the ability of microwave or UHF signals to be used for reliable positioning. Low frequencies are less affected by this problem.

=== Disadvantages ===
Operation at low frequencies faces challenges as well. In general, antennas are most efficient at frequencies whose wavelengths are comparable to the antennas' dimensions (e.g., a quarter-wavelength monopole antenna). Therefore, since higher frequencies have smaller wavelengths, high frequency antennas are typically smaller than low frequency antennas. The larger size of practically efficient low frequency antennas is a significant hurdle that near-field electromagnetic ranging systems cannot overcome without decreasing gain. Applying fractal antennae to NFC requires complex adaptive controls

== Applications ==
The low-frequency, multipath-resistant characteristics of NFER make it well suited for tracking in dense metallic locations, such as typical office and industrial environments. Low frequencies also readily diffract around the human body, which makes tracking people possible without the body blockage experienced by microwave systems like Ultra-wideband (UWB). Systems deployed in complicated indoor propagation environments reportedly achieve 60 cm (24 in) accuracy or better at ranges of 46 m (151 ft) or more. There is also an indication that multiple frequency implementations may yield increased accuracy.

== See also ==
- Near-field, a definition with the Hertz and Maxwell wave models
- Near Field Communication, a short-range wireless technology
- Radio Frequency Identification (RFID)
- Real Time Locating Systems (RTLS)
- Ultra-wideband (UWB)
