= Alison Gail Smith =

Professor of Plant Biochemistry

Alison Gail Smith FRSB
- Education: University of Bristol (BSc); University of Cambridge (PhD)
- Spouse: Sir Andrew Hopper (m. 1988)
- Children: 2
- Scientific career
- Fields: Biochemistry
- Thesis: Chlorosis induction in haloblight disease of bean: a biochemical study (1981)
- Website: www.plantsci.cam.ac.uk/research/alisonsmith

Alison Gail Smith, Lady Hopper FRSB is Professor of Plant Biochemistry in the Department of Plant Sciences at the University of Cambridge, UK. Her research investigates the metabolism of plants, algae and bacteria, in particular vitamin and cofactor biosynthesis.

== Education ==
Smith was educated at the University of Bristol where she was awarded a Bachelor of Science degree in biochemistry in 1977. She moved to the University of Cambridge, to do a Ph.D. investigating the role of a toxin produced by the bacterium Pseudomonas syringae in causing the symptoms of halo blight of green beans, which she completed in 1981.

== Research and career ==
Smith's research investigates the:

...metabolism of plants, algae and bacteria, in particular vitamin and cofactor biosynthesis, using a wide range of techniques from biochemistry through molecular biology to genomics, coupled with mathematical modeling approaches. The knowledge gained from these studies is being used to explore the potential for metabolic engineering of high value products in plants and algae, and other biotechnological uses of algae, such as for biodiesel production. In parallel, studies of symbiotic interactions between algae and bacteria are providing insights into algal communities in natural ecosystems, and in dense cultures necessary for industrial cultivation.

Research in Smith's group is also investigating the potential for exploitation of algae for carbon capture and storage, algae fuel and algaculture. Her research has been funded by the European Union, the Biotechnology and Biological Sciences Research Council, the Engineering and Physical Sciences Research Council, the Economic and Social Research Council and the Natural Environment Research Council.

She is a council member of the Marine Biological Association of the United Kingdom of the United Kingdom and as a member of the board of the National Institute of Agricultural Botany.

== Awards and honours ==
Smith was awarded a Leverhulme Trust Study Abroad Fellowship in 2001 and a best scientific paper award from the Rebeiz Foundation for Basic Research in 2009 for research on Tetrapyrrole profiling in seedlings of the Arabidopsis (rockcress). In 2009, she was awarded an Erskine Fellowship from the University of Canterbury in Christchurch, New Zealand, and she became a Fellow of the Royal Society of Biology (FRSB) in 2012.

Smith was interviewed by Jim Al-Khalili on The Life Scientific, first broadcast on BBC Radio 4 in 2017.

== Personal life ==
Smith is married to computer scientist Andy Hopper (Sir Andrew Hopper), with whom she has two children.
