= Virata Corporation =

Former British engineering company

- Type: Public (Inactive Acquired)
- Industry: Fabless semiconductor company
- Founded: 1998
- Headquarters: Santa Clara, California
- Products: Helium; Argon; Solos; ISOS

Virata Corporation is an inactive acquired company that was a major contributor to the "Cambridge Phenomenon" or Silicon Fen high-tech cluster in the United Kingdom. Case studies and research papers have been created to illustrate the role of social networking in the creation of Virata's success. There is also research available on the role the company played in Silicon Valley venture networks.

== The ATML Period ==
It was formed in June 1993 as Advanced Telecommunication Modules Ltd, a company incorporated in the UK, as a spin-off from Olivetti Research Laboratory in Cambridge. The founders included Dr Hermann Hauser and Professor Andy Hopper; Hauser would serve as chairman from March 1993 to December 2001. ATML was a manufacturer of ATM products and a player in the "ATM to the desktop" market.

In September 1997, due to slow uptake in the ATM systems business, the company opted for a new business strategy focusing on semiconductor design and licensing. There was a substantial headcount reduction at that time.

In February 1998, the Company changed its name to Virata Limited. The choice of name derived from a product family name used by ATML, but it was also derived from an Italian verb meaning "to change course" as used in the nautical context of "tacking" - making progress against a prevailing headwind.

Financial backing for the ATML and Virata Ltd business came in the form of five rounds of VC funding, raising a total of $71 million. An IPO and Secondary Offering would come later.

In July 1998, Virata acquired RSA Communications, a company based in Raleigh, North Carolina.

The company description circa 1999 was: "Virata delivers highly-integrated semiconductors and communications software to Internet access equipment suppliers targeting DSL and broadband wireless devices. Virata's systems expertise, products and support services simplify development; maximize opportunity for differentiation and speed time-to-market."

A typical product is the Helium 210-80 launched in August 2001.

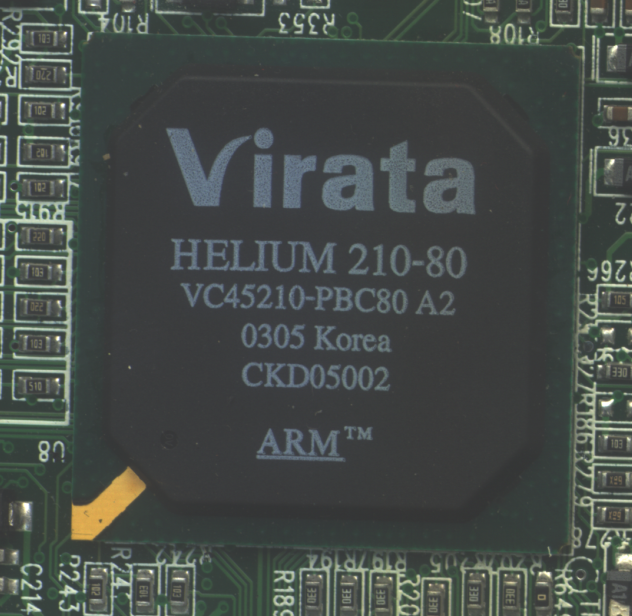
The Helium 210-80 chipset is typical of the dual-ARM core platform used by Virata at that time

== Preparing for IPO ==
On 31 August 1999 the company was incorporated in Delaware as Virata Corporation and the company headquarters became Bunker Hill Lane, Santa Clara, California 95054.

On 3 September 1999 the corporation filed a Form S-1 to register with the Securities and Exchange Commission (SEC). It embarked thereafter on an initial public offering (IPO) that culminated on 17 November 1999 when Virata offered 5 million shares at $14 on the NASDAQ exchange for 25.7% of the company. The company ticker was "VRTA". The IPO raised $81 million and on the first day the price increased from $14 to $27 per share. On 21 March 2000, the Board of Directors approved a two-for-one split of Virata's common stock.

The VRTA share price continued to grow and on 14 July 2000 Virata completed a secondary offering of 6.5 million shares of common stock for 11.8% of the company, with each share valued at $71. The secondary offering raised $531 million and was extremely significant in providing Virata with funding for subsequent events. Together with the five private funding rounds that preceded, the company had now undergone a total of 7 funding rounds raising $683 million in total.

A period of intense company acquisition began in February 2000 with the acquisition of D2 Technologies. This was followed in April with the acquisition of Inverness Systems Ltd Israel, and in August with Agranat Systems, Inc. MA and Excess Bandwidth Corporation CA.

Virata now had operations in Santa Clara, Raleigh, Cambridge, Santa Barbara, Kfar Saba, Maynard, and Taipei as well as a number of sales offices. The company also became an investor - in November 2000 for example Virata joined with Intel, ARM, and others to invest in Bluetooth chip maker Cambridge Silicon Radio.

Virata was voted "Business of the Year" in the Business Weekly East of England Business Awards 2000.

== The Boom Years ==
On 25 May 2001, the company opened a new European headquarters on the Cambridge Science Park. A new building of 2,884 sq. metres (31,000sq ft) provided accommodation for over 90 staff, 3 lab areas (Chip Lab, Hardware Lab and Systems Test Lab) and a customer training suite. It also had a boardroom with a now-infamous table in the shape of a "V" and a presenter's podium in the shape of the "dot" over the "i" in the Virata logo.

Financial years 1998-2001 were very successful with revenues increasing from $8.9M in 1998, $9.3M in 1999, $21.8M in 2000, to over $120M in 2001. Typical customers licensed the semiconductors (e.g. Helium, Argon) and integrated software on silicon (ISOS) for integration into DSL equipment (DSLAM, DSL Router/Modems, Home Gateways) to provide high speed Internet access with integrated voice, wireless and video functionality.

== Merger with Globespan ==
The product offering was stronger on communications processors and integrated networking software than it was on physical layer and DSL firmware. Downturns in the telecommunications market and increasing consolidation in the DSL sector led to the proposal of a merger in October 2001 with Globespan, a company headquartered in Red Bank, NJ. It was projected that the combined company would have a capitalization of $1.3 billion, valuing Virata at $620 million of the new merged company's stock. On 14 December 2001, the respective shareholders approved the merger and Globespan shareholders also approved changing the name of the company to GlobespanVirata, Inc. The company subsequently traded on NASDAQ under the symbol "GSPN".

GlobespanVirata continued to be the market leader in the DSL semiconductor market in 2002 with revenues of $226 million and 28% revenue market share. The Cambridge R&D team continued to design silicon and software for the high-end DSL devices and were involved in the integration of technology from further acquisitions such as the Intersil 802.11 wireless technology.

In an effort to reduce operating costs GlobespanVirata embarked on a series of site closures and employee headcount reduction. In August 2002, it closed the Raleigh and Maynard offices, for example, and there were lay-offs at most sites.

== Merger with Conexant ==
The DSL semiconductor market became increasingly commoditized and, in November 2003, Conexant Systems and GlobespanVirata announced an agreement to combine the two companies in a strategic merger. The merger was completed on 1 March 2004.

Headcount reductions continued and in December 2004 the majority of the ISOS software team in Cambridge was made redundant, having transferred IPR and operations to Conexant India. By June 2005 the remainder of the staff (LSI and software) were also redundant and the Cambridge site was closed.

== Visual Timeline ==
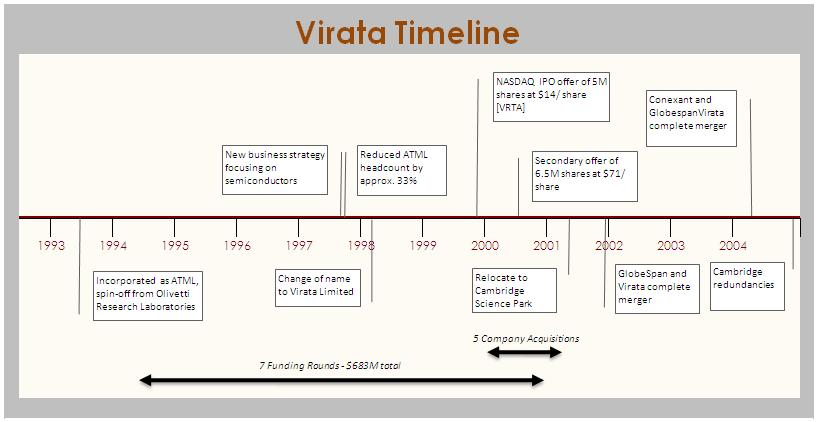

== Virata Employee Recycling ==
Many ex-Virata employees are now employed by leading semiconductor companies, both in Cambridge and in other parts of the world, and several have gone on to form new companies. These include for example: Adventiq, Artimi, Broadcom, Broadlight, Camrivox, Cognidox, CSR, DisplayLink, Green Custard, Ikanos, Intel Corporation, Intellon, SaleOrigin, Solarflare, Tzero, and Vidanti.
