= Global cultural flows =

Socio-geographic concept

Global cultural flow refers to the movement of people, artifacts, and ideas across national boundaries as a result of globalization. The framework of global cultural flows was introduced by anthropologist Arjun Appadurai in his 1990 essay "Disjuncture and difference in the global cultural economy," in which he argues that people ought to reconsider the binary oppositions that were imposed through colonialism, such as those of global vs. local, south vs. north, and metropolitan vs. non-metropolitan. Insisting that global life is shaped by multiple overlapping and uneven flows rather than by a single, uniform culture, Appadurai proposed to understand the global dynamics through the key concept "scapes" that carry capital, images, people, information, technologies, and ideas.

Specifically, Appadurai identified five dimensions of global cultural flow:

1. Ethnoscapes — the flow of people, including migrations, tourists, and refugees;
2. Technoscapes — the global configuration and movement of technologies;
3. Financescapes — the flow of capital, currencies, and global business networks;
4. Mediascapes — the flow of information, cultural production, and media images;
5. Ideoscapes — the flow of political ideas, ideologies, values, and cultural narratives.

The common suffix -scape emphasizes that these terms represent perspectival constructs shaped by the historical, linguistic, and political contexts of different of actors: nation-states, multinationals corporations, diasporic communities, social movements, and intimate communities such as families and neighborhoods. Cultural theorist John Tomlinson argues that these scapes illustrate how globalization creates both cultural convergence and cultural fragmentation, depending on how local actors interpret global influences.

== Background ==
Because cultural exchange was historically restricted by geographical and economic barriers, Appadurai’s framework explains how modern forms of mobility have enabled more complex and asymmetrical cultural transactions. In Modernity at Large (1996), Appadurai expanded this argument, suggesting that these flows increasingly escape state control due to migration, electronic media, and transnational networks.

As these flows travel through national boundaries, they form different combinations and interdependencies, mutate, and divide cultural ideas into "nation" and "state." Inda and Rosaldo (2002) highlight that these flows contribute to a "global interconnectivity" that challenges fixed cultural boundaries and generates hybrid identities.

Appadurai emphasizes that although disjunctures between the flows of people, machinery, money, and ideas have always existed, the scale and speed of contemporary globalization amplify these tensions. This process is closely tied to deterritorialization, which Appadurai describes as the main force affecting globalization in the sense that people from different countries and socioeconomic backgrounds are mixing with one another; namely, the lower classes of some countries integrating in to wealthier societies via the workforce. Subsequently, these people reproduce their ethnic culture, but in a deterritorialized context.

Appadurai claims that global flows occur in and through the growing disjunctures between the scapes. The Olympic Games, for instance, organize financescapes (regional, national, and international business networks come in to invest in the host city) and mediascapes (the opening and closing ceremonies showcase national cultures), as well as ideoscapes (images of the host city and country, their history, and customs circulate worldwide to attract tourists) and ethnoscapes (migrations of business networks and localities that are removed from parts of the city to make space for Olympic venues).

Finanscapes can conflict with ethnoscapes, as networks of global Social movements often protest against Human Rights Violations that take place during the Games; as result, ideoscapes then clash with ethnoscapes, as city brands and narratives are disrupted by these demonstrations and subsequent negative press.

== The five dimensions ==
=== Ethnoscape ===
The ethnoscape refers to human migration, the flow of people across boundaries. This includes migrants, refugees, exiles, and tourists, among other moving individuals and groups, all of whom appear to affect the politics of (and between) nations to a considerable degree.

Ethnoscapes allow for one to recognize that their notions of space, place, and community have become much more complex—indeed, a ‘single community’ may now be dispersed across the globe. Appadurai claims that this is not to say there are no relatively stable communities and networks of kinship, friendship, work, and leisure, as well as of birth, residence, and other filial forms. Rather, it highlights that the shape of these stabilities is warped by human motion, as more people deal with the realities of having to move or the desires of wanting to move.

Tourism, in particular, generally provide people from developed countries with contact to people in the Developing World.

=== Technoscape ===
The term technoscape refers to the rapid global movement of technology, both mechanical and informational systems, and the ways such technology reshapes cultural and economic life. As technological innovation accelerates, devices, networks and infrastructures increasingly transcend national boundaries.

For example, the spread of the internet, mobile phones and digital platforms has transformed not just communication, but production, labor and consumption worldwide. Technologies thus both enable and reflect cultural flows, merging previously separated domains of economics, media and identity.

=== Financescape ===
Financescape refers to the flow of money and global business networks across borders. Appadurai poses that when considering the financescape framework, one must consider how global capital today moves in an increasingly fluid and non-isomorphic manner, thus contributing to an overall unpredictability of all the five aspects of global cultural flows as a whole.

The fluidity of capital has been expounded on further by sociologists such as Anthony Giddens, who, in his 1999 BBC Reith lecture on globalization, claims that the advent of electronic money has rendered the transfer of capital and finance around the world subject to an increasingly easy process that posits a major paradigm shift. Giddens suggests that this ease has the potential to destabilize what would be considered prior as stable economies.

Today, the global transfer of money has only accelerated in pace, with transactions in various large, international finance hubs (e.g. NYSE) have almost immediate effects on economies around the globe.

=== Mediascape ===
The mediascape refers to the scope of electronic and print media in global cultural flows; it refers both to the distribution of the electronic capabilities to produce and disseminate information (newspapers, Magazines, television, Films, etc.), as well as to "the images of the world created by these media." Such mediascapes provide vast deposits of images, narratives, and ethnoscapes to viewers, profoundly mixing the "world of commodities" and the "world of news and politics."

In particular, advertising can directly impact the landscape (in the form of posters and billboards) and also subtly influence—through persuasive techniques and an increasingly pervasive presence—the way that people perceive reality.

The term mediascape predates Appadurai's use; it was first used in trade by the American company Mediascape Corporation, formed in 1992, for the purpose of delivering rich media through the Internet and Web. The corporation is the U.S. owner of the federal trademark for use of that mark in relation to multimedia products in commerce.

The term mediascape may also describe visual culture. For example, "the American mediascape is becoming increasingly partisan" or simply to denote "what's on" as in "a quick survey of the British mediascape shows how much Channel 4 has lost its way". It is also used as a generic term to describe a digital media artifact where items of digital media are associated with regions in space and can then be triggered by the location of the person experiencing the media. Thus, in a mediascape, a person may walk around an area and as they do so they will hear digitally stored sounds associated with different places in that area.

=== Ideoscape ===
An ideoscape encompasses the global circulation of ideas, ideologies, symbols and imaginaries, from political doctrines and human-rights discourses to consumer ideologies and environmental imaginaries. These flows can include grassroots activism, digital campaigns, missionary work, and state-level ideological programs.

Because ideologies often cross national boundaries and interact with diasporic communities, migratory networks and media industries, ideoscapes are deeply entangled with the other "-scapes", yet they may follow distinct logics of diffusion, contestation, and reinterpretation.

These five "-scapes" are not isolated, they interrelate, overlap, and often conflict. Arjun Appadurai emphasizes that global cultural flows occur in and through the growing disjunctures among ethnoscapes, technoscapes, financescapes, mediascapes, and ideoscapes. These disjunctures mean that different flows operate at different speeds, scales, and trajectories, producing tensions between cultural expression, economic forces, technological change, and political ideologies.

For instance, the rapid circulation of financial capital may accelerate technological adoption, while ideologies and media representations lag behind or generate resistance. By highlighting these mismatches, Appadurai argues that globalization is neither smooth nor uniform, but shaped by contested interpretations, uneven power relations, and the diverse ways local communities negotiate global influences.

== Reception and criticism ==
Appadurai’s framework of global cultural flows has been widely cited in anthropology, cultural studies, and globalization research. Scholars have praised the model for drawing attention to the cultural dimensions of globalization and for providing a vocabulary to describe the complexity of transnational interactions. The five scapes are often used in teaching and research as a way to illustrate how different types of flows overlap and diverge.

At the same time, the framework has attracted criticism. Some scholars argue that the scapes are primarily metaphorical and lack empirical precision, making them difficult to apply in systematic research. Others note that the categories can overlap in ways that blur analytical boundaries, which may reduce their usefulness for case studies. Critics have also suggested that the model emphasizes disjuncture and fragmentation but does not fully account for the ways global flows can be coordinated or regulated through institutions and governance.

Later commentators have pointed out that Appadurai’s essay was written in the early 1990s, before the rise of digital platforms and social media, and that the framework may need updating to reflect contemporary forms of global connectivity. Despite these limitations, the scapes continue to be influential as a conceptual tool for understanding globalization as a cultural as well as economic process.

== See also ==
  - audio tour
  - GPS tour
  - podguide
  - Media Scape
  - Mscape
