= Differentiated security =

Differentiated security is a form of computer security that deploys a range of different security policies and mechanisms according to the identity and context of a user or transaction.

This makes it much more difficult to scale or replicate attacks, since each cluster/individual has a different security profile and there should be no common weaknesses.

One way of achieving this is by subdividing the population into small differentiated clusters. At the extreme, each individual belongs to a different class.

== See also ==
- Differentiated service (design pattern)
