= Active Bat =

Location system

Active Bat is a low-power, Wireless indoor location system accurate up to 3 cm. It is based on a principle of trilateration, and relies on multiple ultrasonic receivers embedded in the ceiling and measures time-of-flight to them.

Active Bat is an indoor localization system which gives an accuracy within centimeters. This is a range based technique, which works by finding the distance to minimum of three reference nodes and then using multilateration technique to find the exact position. The distance to reference nodes is found out using the time of arrival of ultrasonic signals from the reference nodes.

== See also ==
- Sentient computing
- Ubiquitous computing
