= Hermann Hauser =

Entrepreneur

Hermann Hauser KBE FRS FREng FInstP CPhys
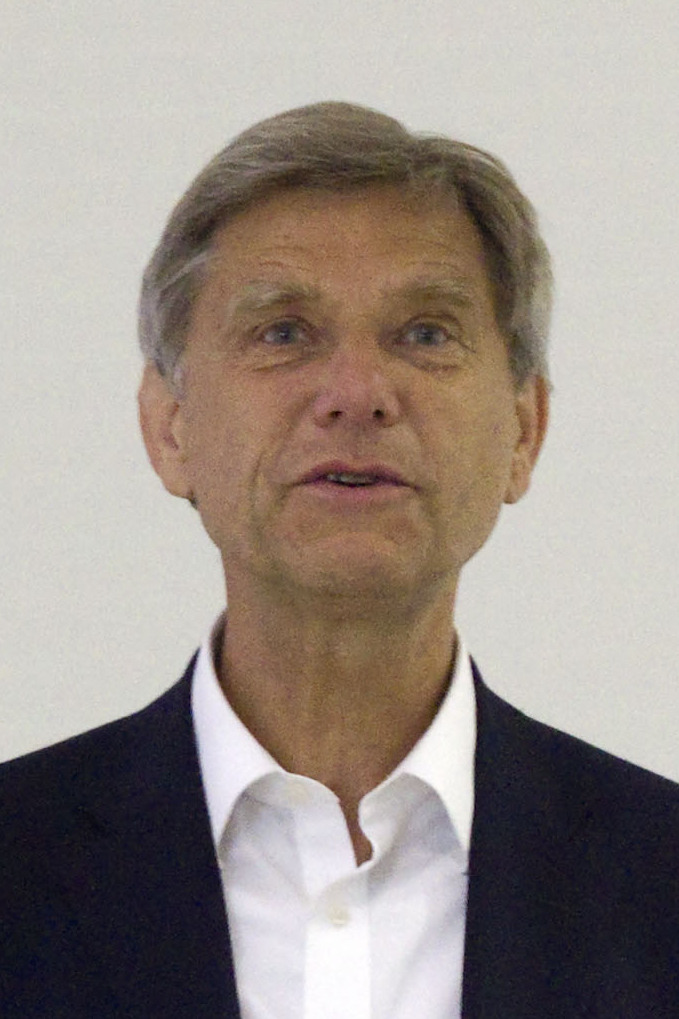
- Hauser in 2010
- Born: Hermann Maria Hauser; 23 October 1948 (age 77); Vienna, Austria
- Education: Vienna University (MA); King's College, Cambridge (PhD)
- Known for: Inventions; Entrepreneurship; Venture capitalist
- Spouse: Pamela Raspe
- Scientific career
- Workplaces: Amadeus Capital Partners Ltd; Plastic Logic; Cavendish Laboratory; ARM Ltd; Cambridge Network; Olivetti Research Laboratory; Globespan-Virata Inc.; Acorn Computers; Advanced Telecommunication Modules Ltd
- Thesis: Mechanically Activated Chemical Reactions (1977)
- Website: www.amadeuscapital.com/team/hermann-hauser/

Hermann Maria Hauser KBE (born 1948) is an entrepreneur, venture capitalist and inventor who is primarily associated with the Cambridge technology community in England.

== Education and early life ==
When Hauser was 16 he went to the United Kingdom to learn English at a language school in Cambridge. After a master's degree in physics from Vienna University, he returned to King's College, Cambridge to do a PhD in physics at the Cavendish Laboratory.

== Career ==
Hauser is probably best known for his part in setting up Acorn Computers with Chris Curry in 1978. When Olivetti took control of Acorn in 1985 he became vice-president for research at Olivetti, in charge of laboratories in the US and Europe. In 1986, Hauser co-founded the Olivetti Research Laboratory (ORL) in Cambridge with Andy Hopper, who became the laboratory's director. Hauser's role in Acorn was portrayed by Edward Baker-Duly in the BBC drama Micro Men.

In 1988, Hauser left Olivetti to start the Active Book Company, investing £1 million of his own money. The company sought to develop a portable ARM-based microcomputer "the size of a paperback book", featuring a screen and stylus for interaction and employing a "book" metaphor known as Hyperpage. The company planned to launch its first product after Christmas 1990, featuring an approximately A5-sized reflective display, automatic recognition of printed, as opposed to cursive, characters, and employing a multipurpose chip called Hercules featuring a static, low-power ARM core. A licensing agreement had been signed with Acorn for access to that company's hardware and software technology, and the company was seeking application developers for the platform. The Active Book was intended to cost around $2,000, provide eight to ten hours of battery life, and was to run the Helios operating system. Not wanting to repeat the mistakes made by Acorn, which had kept its technology to itself, he demonstrated the Active Book to as many large companies as he could. AT&T Corporation acquired Active Book in July 1991 and incorporated it into their EO Personal Communicator, which was released in April 1993. Hauser became chief technical officer and chairman of EO Europe. Sales did not meet expectations, and AT&T's EO subsidiary folded on 29 July 1994.

In 1990, Hauser was involved in spinning out Advanced RISC Machines (ARM) from Acorn.

In 1993, Hauser set up Advanced Telecommunication Modules Ltd with Andy Hopper. The company was acquired by Conexant Systems on 1 March 2004. He founded NetChannel Ltd in June 1996 as a holding company to begin work on marketing the NetStation. NetChannel was sold to AOL in 1996. He claimed in the 1990s that the networking technology used for AppleTalk was based on the (unpatented) Cambridge Ring.

In 1997 he co-founded Amadeus Capital Partners Ltd, a venture capital company, and in 1998 he co-founded Cambridge Network with David Cleevely and Alec Broers.

In 2000, Plastic Logic was founded, with Hauser as chairman.

On 14 June 2001, the Hauser-Raspe Foundation was registered as a charity to advance education, by Hauser and his wife Pamela Raspe.

In August 2004, Amadeus Capital Partners led the Series B venture capital financing of Solexa, and Hauser joined its board of directors. Solexa developed a next-generation DNA sequencing technology which became the market leader; the company was sold to Illumina, Inc of San Diego in January 2007 for over $US600 million. In 2009, Hauser was announced as the first customer of the Illumina Personal Genome Sequencing service.

As of 2009, Hauser is the head of the East Anglia Stem Cell research network.

Hauser is a non-executive director of Cambridge Display Technology, a non-executive director of XMOS Ltd and a member of the board of Red-M (Communications) Ltd. He holds honorary doctorates from the Universities of Bath and Loughborough and from Anglia Ruskin University. He is a member of the advisory board on the Higher Education Innovation Fund, and of the UK's Council for Science and Technology.

Hauser was commissioned by the Department for Business, Innovation and Skills to write a report on technology and innovation in the UK. Publication of the report in 2010 led to the establishment of Catapult centres with £200 million of government funding.

He was co-founder of ARM Holdings, the Cambridge-based microchip manufacturer that was bought in 2016 by Japan's SoftBank.

Since 2015, he is actively supporting Austrian start-ups and technology companies. In particular, he has invested in 2017 in the MEMS-speaker start-up "USound" and in eyeson, a cloud based Unified Communications solution nominated by Gartner Inc. as Cool Vendor in Unified Communications, 2017.

In 2022, he invested in the Munich-based quantum computing startup planqc, a spin-off from the renowned Max Planck Institute for Quantum Optics, and joined the advisory board.

== Awards and honours ==
Hauser was voted the UK's "Computer Personality of the Year" of 1984. In 2010, Eureka, in its "100 most important scientists", placed Hauser at 51. He became patron of The Centre for Computing History in December 2011, 30 years after the launch of the BBC Micro.

In 2001, Hauser became an Honorary Doctor at Anglia Ruskin University. On 8 July 2002, Hauser was elected a Fellow of the Institute of Physics (FInstP) and an International Fellow of the Royal Academy of Engineering (FREng). In May 2004 he presented the prestigious IEE Pinkerton Lecture. In 2005, Hauser received a Lifetime Achievement Award for his work as a venture capitalist and entrepreneur. The award was presented at the annual European Electronics Industry Awards in London. Hauser was awarded an Honorary CBE for "innovative service to the UK enterprise sector" in 2001. In 1998, Hauser was elected into an honorary fellowship of Hughes Hall, Cambridge, and he was also elected into an honorary fellowship of King's College, Cambridge with effect from 1 January 2000. In the same year he was awarded the Mountbatten Medal.

Hauser was elected a Fellow of the Royal Society (FRS) in 2012. His nomination reads:

Distinguished as a science-based innovator and serial-entrepreneur whose ventures have been at the forefront of UK innovation. A major contributor to the global technology and growth agendas and an influential member of senior policy making bodies. An inspiration and role-model for generations of entrepreneurs who has been directly involved in many companies, providing enthusiasm, mentoring, and financing leading to technology based wealth creation at scale.

Hauser was elected a Distinguished Fellow of the British Computer Society (DFBCS) in 2013 recognising his contribution to computing science in the UK.
