= Ultrasound Identification =

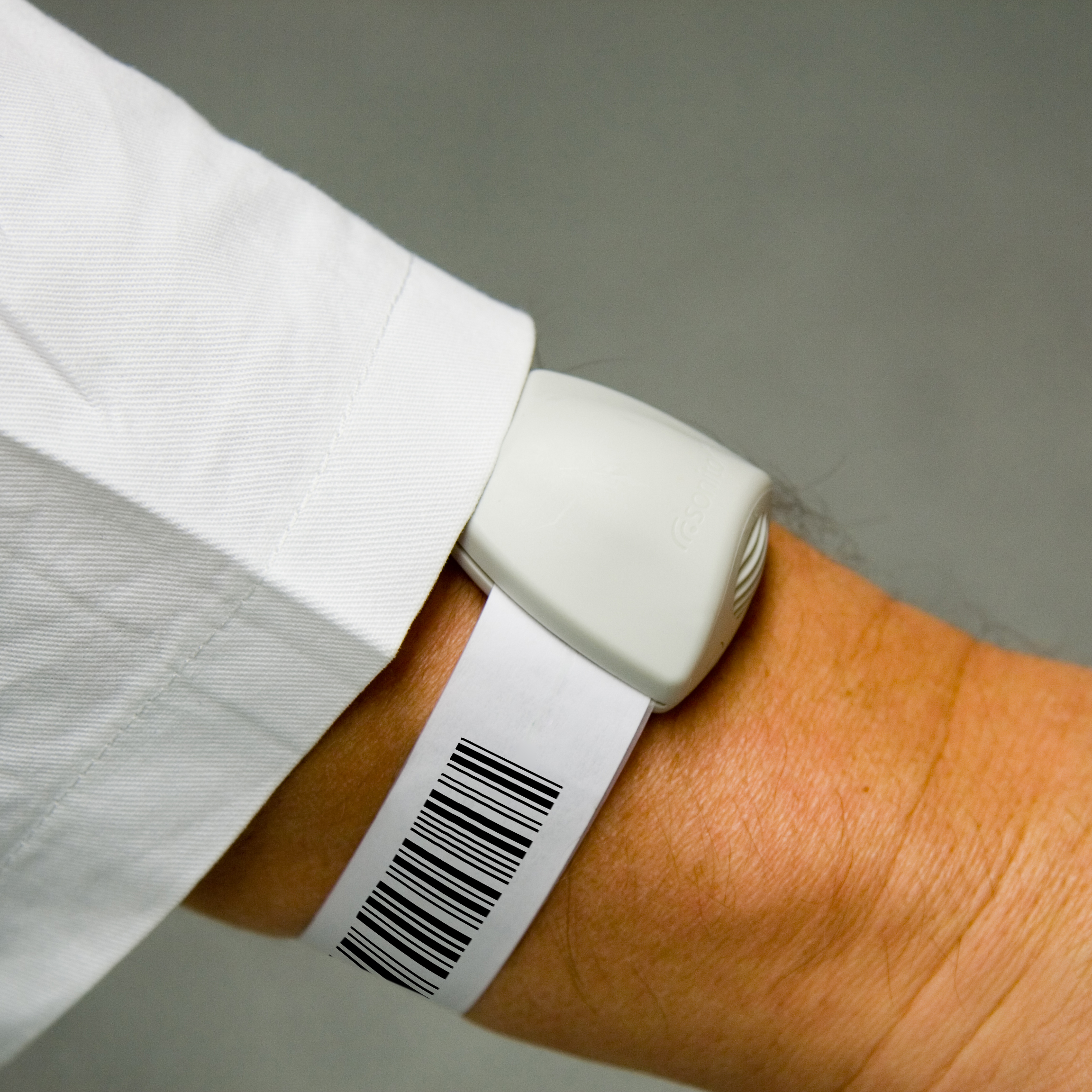
USID Patient-tag. Foto: Sonitor Technologies

Ultrasound Identification is a real-time locating system (RTLS) or indoor positioning system (IPS) technology used to automatically determine and identify the location of objects with room accuracy.

The approach is using simple, inexpensive nodes (badges/tags) attached to the surface of persons, objects and devices, which then transmit an ultrasound signal to communicate their locations to microphone sensors.

Because ultrasound signal wavelengths have short reach, they are confined to lesser distant locations than with wireless transmissions with higher susceptibility to multiple reflection, multipath and through-the-wall multiple room responses. Hence ultrasound-based RTLS is considered a more robust alternative to passive radio-frequency identification (pRFID) and even to active radio-frequency identification (aRFID) in complex indoor environments (such as hospitals), where radio waves get multiply transmitted and reflected, thereby compromising the positioning accuracy. Generally the ultrasound signal does not interfere with sensitive medical equipment.

A handicap of ultrasound nodes is the exposition of the sound transducer at the surface, which prevents from hermetically encapsulating the node. Vapour sterilisation is not offered with these nodes.
