= Planqc =

Quantum Computing Company

planqc is a quantum computing company based in Garching. Founded in 2022 as a spin-off from the Max Planck Institute of Quantum Optics, the company develops quantum processors that use neutral atoms trapped in optical lattices of light to perform computations.

== History ==
planqc was founded in 2022 by Alexander Glätzle, Sebastian Blatt, and Johannes Zeiher as the first spin-off from the Max Planck Institute of Quantum Optics within the Munich Quantum Valley initiative. The company is part of broader European efforts to develop locally built quantum computing technologies. The company’s founders and leadership include researchers formerly affiliated with the University of Oxford, Harvard University, and the University of California, Berkeley.

In the same year, planqc secured seed funding of approximately €4.6 million from UVC Partners and Speedinvest to support the development of its neutral-atom quantum processors. Among the investors were Hermann Hauser, Ann-Kristin Achleitner, and Markus Wagner, who also joined the company's advisory board.

planqc’s scientific advisory board includes researchers in quantum physics, such as Immanuel Bloch, J. Ignacio Cirac, Artur Ekert, Dieter Jaksch, and Markus Müller.

In 2023, the company was selected by the German Aerospace Center (DLR) to develop a 1,000-qubit quantum computer under a contract valued at approximately €29 million.

In 2024, planqc was selected to lead a €21 million project to build a 1,000-qubit system integrated into the Leibniz Supercomputing Centre (LRZ) high-performance computing infrastructure. The initiative forms part of Germany’s broader national quantum-computing programme, in which neutral-atom systems are being developed for scalable hardware and for applications in scientific and industrial simulation. The same year, the company completed a €50 million Series A funding round led by CATRON Holding and DTCF. In parallel, the German Federal Ministry for Economic Affairs and Climate Action (BMWK) announced an investment to support planqc’s further development.

In 2025, planqc announced collaborations with the European Space Agency (ESA), Airbus, the Fraunhofer Institutes, and the consulting firm d-fine, to explore industrial applications of quantum computing, including materials science, climate modeling, and mobility optimization. The work also includes joint research with the Technical University of Munich on quantum-based algorithms for aerodynamics and aircraft-stability simulations.

Later that year, planqc received the Deutscher Gründerpreis (German Founders Award) in the “Start-up” category.

== Technology ==
planqc builds quantum processors using ultracold neutral atoms confined in optical traps. Neutral-atom platforms are used internationally as an alternative route to scalable quantum processors, with multiple industrial groups developing architectures based on programmable atom arrays. The atoms are manipulated using laser pulses to implement qubits and quantum gates. The platform operates at room temperature and is designed for integration into high-performance computing systems.
