= Public Culture =

- Discipline: Cultural studies
- Language: English
- Edited by: Arjun Appadurai and Erica Robles-Anderson

Publication details
- History: 1988–present
- Publisher: Duke University Press (United States)
- Frequency: Triannually

Standard abbreviations
- ISO 4: Public Cult.

Indexing
- CODEN: PUCUE7
- ISSN: 0899-2363 (print); 1527-8018 (web)
- LCCN: 89644254
- OCLC no.: 18040687

Links
- Journal homepage; Current issue

Public Culture is a peer-reviewed, interdisciplinary academic journal of cultural studies published by Duke University Press. It is sponsored by the Department of Media, Culture, and Communication at New York University.

Public Culture has a focus on ethnographies, and analyses of cultural politics in globalization. It is published three times per year.

== History ==
The journal was established in 1988 by anthropologists Carol Breckenridge and Arjun Appadurai. Professor of Sociology and Director of the Institute for Public Knowledge at New York University Eric Klinenberg served as Public Culture's editor-in-chief from 2010 to 2015, during which time he initiated the online book review offshoot Public Books. From 2015 to 2019, Public Culture was edited by Shamus Khan, Professor of Sociology at Columbia University. Since 2020, the journal is edited by Arjun Appadurai and Erica Robles-Anderson, Professors of Media, Culture, and Communication at New York University.

== Reception ==
Public Culture received awards for Best New Journal in 1992 and Best Special Issue in 2000 from The Council of Editors of Learned Journals. In 2013, the same body named Public Culture co-winner of the Phoenix Award for Significant Editorial Achievement, recognizing the journal's revitalization and transformation with a "marked emphasis on accessibility and broader relevance." The journal has also been reviewed in The Times Literary Supplement.
