= Wireless triangulation =

Wireless triangulation is a method of determining the location of wireless nodes using IEEE 802.11 standards. It is normally implemented by measuring the RSSI signals strength.

== See also ==
- Location awareness
- Real-time locating standards
- Wireless local area network
- Wireless personal area network
