= Mscape =

Media gaming platform

- Developer: Hewlett-Packard
- Operating system: Windows Mobile
- Type: gaming platform

Mscape was a mobile media gaming platform developed by Hewlett-Packard that could be used to create location-based games. The development of Mscape was discontinued (and its website mscapers.com shut down) on March 31, 2010.

The Mscape platform was flexible. HP encouraged developers to use Mscape to create not just games, but also informational guides to points of interest, imaginative stories about places, and practical information about worksites. Mscape made a player's GPS location an element of the gameplay. Events in a game were triggered by a player's location, and the player interacted with a game by moving from place to place.

Mscape was used to create mediascapes, interactive experiences made up of video, audio, images, and text. Mscape stored the digital media files in a structure that associates them with positions from a GPS system. Players could play mediascapes on a Windows Mobile device, such as a mobile phone or a PDA that is GPS-enabled. As players move daround, the device sensed their position and activated the appropriate media files.

== History ==
Mscape had its origins in 2002 as Mobile Bristol, a project that explored how mobile devices and pervasive information technology could enhance people's interactions with their physical environments and with each other in urban and public spaces.

With funding from the British government, researchers in HP Labs Bristol, the University of Bristol, and Appliance Studio collaborated on several trials, working with artists, writers, educators, and others to create a series of interactive, context-aware mobile experiences. In one trial, visitors to Bristol's harbor could virtually navigate the history of what was once one of Britain's busiest ports. In another, middle school students could experience life as a lion by walking around a virtual savannah.

In 2007, HP made the authoring suite and mobile player software available for download at no cost from the Mscapers community website.

== Technology ==
Mscape evolved from research in Augmented reality (which deals with the combination of real world and computer generated data) and from developments in location-based services (services available through a mobile device based on the device’s geographical location). The Mscape technology was also an example of Ubiquitous computing and a context-aware pervasive system.

Three technologies were essential to mediascapes: portable computing, embedded sensors, and context-coded information and services.

Portable computing. Mscape was made practical by the ready availability of consumer GPS navigation devices such as GPS-equipped PDAs and smartphones.

Embedded sensors. The publicly available version of Mscape took advantage only of a player’s GPS location., However, experimental deployments of mediascapes used other types of sensors, such as short-range radio beacons and heart rate monitors. The Mscape technology enabled developers to create plug-ins to easily incorporate data from sensors such as infrared and radio frequency beacons, RFID tags, digital compasses, and other types of sensors.

Context-coded information. Media — images, video, audio, and Flash interactions — was triggered by the logic assigned to a specific space. The logic could not only define behavior based on a person’s presence with the space, but could also vary the behavior based on the number of times the person has entered the space. Media types include:

- HTML, MP3, and WAV audio
- JPEG and GIF images
- MPEG, WMV, and SWF video and Flash interactions

For future implementations, Hewlett-Packard proposed a client-server architecture using streaming media over a wireless network. Such implementations would enable multi-player games. Streaming media over a wireless network would also be useful in contexts in which content needs to be updated frequently to reflect rapidly changing information or time-based data.

== Tools ==
=== Mscape Player ===
Mscape Player played mediascapes on Windows Mobile devices, such as mobile phones or PDAs that are GPS-enabled.

=== Mscape Library ===
Developers and players used Mscape Library to manage the mediascapes they have on their computers. Players downloaded mediascapes from the Mscapers website into Mscape Library. They then used Mscape Library to copy those mediascapes to their Windows Mobile device. Developers could also use Mscape Library to launch Mscape Maker and Mscape Tester.,

Mscape Library also detected whether a Windows Mobile device has Mscape Player installed on it, and alerted the user and installed the player if it didn't.

=== Mscape Maker ===
Developers used Mscape Maker to create mediascapes. Mscape Maker had four work areas:

Place Editor. Developers used the place editor to set up the map that is the basis of the mediascape. The map comprises both an image and the GPS coordinates that associate the map image with a real place on the surface of the earth. Once the map was set up, a developer defined areas on the map that trigger digital media and interactions with the mediascape. Simple mediascapes could be created by dragging and dropping components onto the map in the Place Editor.

Script Editor. In the script editor, developers use da much simplified version of C# to script events. HP compared Mscape's scripting language to Adobe Flash ActionScript. Their intent was to make Mscape's scripting language simple enough for beginners: "you can pick it up fairly quickly and you can achieve quite advanced things without having to do lots of programming."

Script Object Window. The script object window listed all the script objects that are used in a mediascape. Developers used scripts to manipulate and coordinate four types of script objects:

- Media — audio, video, Flash movies, and web pages
- Sensors — GPS coordinates, places (based on MapLib files), regions, and speakers (audio that appears to come from a particular point)
- States — numeric, text, and true/false variables
- Tools — buttons, timers, alarms, playlists, and so on

Properties Window. Developers use the properties window to view and change the properties of script objects.

Mscape Maker saved mediascapes in two file formats:

- .msl files are the native format in the authoring environment.
- .msz files are the compressed format played on a Windows Mobile device.

=== Mscape Tester ===
Mscape Tester simulateed what a mediascape looks like on a Windows Mobile device. A developer can place a small figure at any point on the mediascape's map to test the gameplay at that point.

== Licensing ==
The Mscape platform was available under either a non-commercial license (for not-for-profit or educational use) or a commercial license.

Developers who uploaded mediascapes to the community website could offer their mediascapes to other users either under a default license (a non–exclusive, royalty–free, worldwide, perpetual license to use, reproduce, distribute, display, perform, or prepare derivative works of the mediascape) or under a Creative Commons license.

== Types of mediascapes ==
Mediascapes could be either portable or anchored.

- Portable mediascapes could be played anywhere. They typically required players to set up the game area before beginning to play.
- Anchored mediascapes could be played only in the specific place for which they were designed.

Because the events in mediascapes were triggered by GPS coordinates, mediascapes could offer users various types of experiences of a place.

- Games presented some sort of challenge. Players could win or lose, succeed or fail.
- Guides provided specific facts about how the place is now or was in the past. They focused on information
- Stories were an imaginative treatment of facts or fiction. They focused on feelings and thoughts places evoke.

== Developers ==
Members of the HP Labs team who contributed to the development of Mscape were:

- Phil Stenton
- Richard Hull
- Patrick Goddi
- Josephine Reid
- Ben Clayton
- Tom Melamed
- Susie Wee
- Erik Geelhoed

Members of the HP Labs team who contributed to the development of the Mscapers community website were:

- Andrew Dahley
- Patrick Goddi
- Kurt MacDonald
- Allen Arakaki

== See also ==
- Augmented Reality
- Augmented Virtuality
- GPS tour
- I-Tours
- Mediascape
- Mixed Reality
- Scvngr
