= Arjun Appadurai =

Indian-American anthropologist (born 1949)

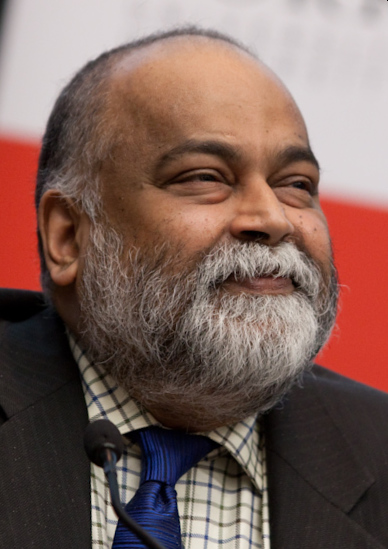
- Appadurai during a lecture in March 2009
- Born: 4 February 1949 (age 77); Bombay, Province of Bombay, Dominion of India (now Mumbai, Maharashtra, India)
- Education: Brandeis University (B.A.); University of Chicago (M.A., Ph.D.)
- Scientific career
- Fields: Anthropology
- Workplaces: New York University; The New School; University of Pennsylvania

Arjun Appadurai FRAI (born 4 February 1949) is an Indian-American anthropologist who has been recognized as a major theorist in globalization studies. He is an elected fellow of the Royal Anthropological Institute of Great Britain and Ireland. In his anthropological work, he discusses the importance of the modernity of nation-states and globalization. He is the former professor of anthropology and South Asian Languages and Civilizations at the University of Chicago, Humanities Dean at the University of Chicago, director of the Center on Cities and Globalization at Yale University, provost and senior vice president for Academic Affairs at The New School, and professor of education and human development studies at New York University's Steinhardt School. He is currently professor emeritus of the Media, Culture, and Communication Department in the Steinhardt School.

Some of his notable works include Worship and Conflict under Colonial Rule (1981), Disjuncture and Difference in the Global Cultural Economy (1990), of which an expanded version is found in Modernity at Large (1996), and Fear of Small Numbers (2006). He was elected a Fellow of the American Academy of Arts and Sciences in 1997.

== Early life and education ==
Appadurai was born on 4 February 1949 into a Tamil family in present-day Mumbai, Maharashtra, India. He graduated from St. Xavier's High School, Fort, Mumbai, and earned his Intermediate Arts degree from Elphinstone College, Mumbai. He moved to the United States and received his B.A. from Brandeis University in 1970. After this he earned his M.A. (1973) and Ph.D. (1976) from the Committee on Social Thought at the University of Chicago. He then spent a brief time at Yale University.

== Career ==
=== University of Pennsylvania ===
Appadurai taught for many years at the University of Pennsylvania, in the departments of Anthropology and South Asia Studies. In 1984, during his time there, he hosted a conference through the Penn Ethnohistory program. This conference led to the publication of the volume called The Social Life of Things: Commodities in Cultural Perspective (1986).

=== The New School ===
In 2004, after a brief time as administrator at Yale University, Appadurai became Provost of The New School. Appadurai's resignation from the Provost's office was announced 30 January 2006 by New School President Bob Kerrey. He held the John Dewey Distinguished Professorship in the Social Sciences at New School. Appadurai became one of the more outspoken critics of President Kerrey when he attempted to appoint himself provost in 2008.

=== New York University ===
In 2008 it was announced that Appadurai was appointed Goddard Professor of Media, Culture, and Communication at the NYU Steinhardt School of Culture, Education, and Human Development. Appadurai retired as emeritus from the department in 2021.

=== Bard Graduate Center ===
In 2021, Appadurai was appointed Max Weber Global Professor at the Bard Graduate Center, though he is based in Berlin and teaches remotely.

=== Affiliations ===
Appadurai is a co-founder of the academic journal Public Culture; founder of the non-profit Partners for Urban Knowledge, Action and Research (PUKAR) in Mumbai; co-founder and co-director of Interdisciplinary Network on Globalization (ING); and a fellow of the American Academy of Arts and Sciences. He has served as a consultant or advisor to a wide range of public and private organizations, including the Ford, Rockefeller and MacArthur Foundations; UNESCO; the World Bank; and the National Science Foundation.

Appadurai has presided over Chicago globalization plan, at many public and private organizations (such as the Ford Foundation, the Rockefeller Foundation, UNESCO, the World Bank, etc.) consultant and long-term concern issues of globalization, modernity and ethnic conflicts.

Appadurai has many scholarships and grants, and has received numerous academic honors. He has been a fellow at the Center for Advanced Study in the Behavioral Sciences at Stanford University and the Institute for Advanced Study in Princeton, New Jersey, as well as the Open Society Institute (New York). In 1997, he was elected to the American Academy of Arts and Sciences. In 2013, he was awarded an honorary doctorate Erasmus University in the Netherlands. He holds concurrent academic positions as a Mercator Fellow, Free University and Humboldt University, Berlin; Honorary Professor in the Department of Media and Communication at Erasmus University, Rotterdam; and Senior Research Partner at the Max-Planck Institute for Religious and Ethnic Diversity, Göttingen.

He also served as a consultant or adviser, extensive public and private organizations, including many large foundations (Ford, MacArthur and Rockefeller); the UNESCO; UNDP; World Bank; the US National Endowment for the Humanities; National Science Foundation; and Infosys Foundation. He served on the Social Sciences jury for the Infosys Prize in 2010 and 2017. He currently serves as the Asian Art Program Advisory Committee members in the Solomon Guggenheim Museum, and the forum D 'Avignon Paris Scientific Advisory Board.

== Work ==
Some of his most important works include Worship and Conflict under Colonial Rule (1981), Disjuncture and Difference in the Global Cultural Economy (1990), of which an expanded version is found in Modernity at Large (1996), and Fear of Small Numbers (2006). In The Social Life of Things (1986), Appadurai argued that commodities do not only have economic value; they have political value and social lives as well. He was elected a Fellow of the American Academy of Arts and Sciences in 1997.

His doctoral work was based on the car festival held in the Parthasarathi temple in Triplicane, Madras. Arjun Appadurai is member of the advisory board of the Forum d'Avignon, international meetings of culture, the economy and the media. He is also an advisory member of the journal Janus Unbound: Journal of Critical Studies.

=== Disjuncture and globalization ===
In his best known work 'Disjuncture and Difference in the Global Cultural Economy' Appadurai lays out his meta theory of disjuncture. For him the ‘new global cultural economy has to be seen as a complex, overlapping, disjunctive order’. This order is composed of different interrelated, yet disjunctive global cultural flows, specifically the following five:

1. Ethnoscapes: the migration of people across cultures and borders
2. Mediascapes: the variety of media that shape the way we understand our world
3. Technoscapes: the scope and movement of technology (mechanical and informational) around the world
4. Financescapes: the worldwide flux of money and capital
5. Ideoscapes: the global flow of ideas and ideologies

=== The social imaginary ===
Appadurai articulated a view of cultural activity known as the social imaginary, which is composed of the five dimensions of global cultural flows.

He describes his articulation of the imaginary as:

The image, the imagined, the imaginary – these are all terms that direct us to something critical and new in global cultural processes: the imagination as a social practice. No longer mere fantasy (opium for the masses whose real work is somewhere else), no longer simple escape (from a world defined principally by more concrete purposes and structures), no longer elite pastime (thus not relevant to the lives of ordinary people), and no longer mere contemplation (irrelevant for new forms of desire and subjectivity), the imagination has become an organized field of social practices, a form of work (in the sense of both labor and culturally organized practice), and a form of negotiation between sites of agency (individuals) and globally defined fields of possibility. This unleashing of the imagination links the play of pastiche (in some settings) to the terror and coercion of states and their competitors. The imagination is now central to all forms of agency, is itself a social fact, and is the key component of the new global order.

Appadurai credits Benedict Anderson with developing notions of imagined communities. Some key figures who have worked on the imaginary are Cornelius Castoriadis, Charles Taylor, Jacques Lacan (who especially worked on the symbolic, in contrast with imaginary and the real), and Dilip Gaonkar. However, Appadurai's ethnography of urban social movements in the city of Mumbai has proved to be contentious with several scholars like the Canadian anthropologist, Judith Whitehead arguing that SPARC (an organization which Appadurai espouses as an instance of progressive social activism in housing) being complicit in the World Bank's agenda for re-developing Mumbai.

== Publications ==
=== Books ===
- (with Neta Alexander) Failure. Polity Press. (2020)
- Banking on Words: The Failure of Language in the Age of Derivative Finance. The University of Chicago Press. (2016)
- The Future as Cultural Fact: Essays on the Global Condition. Verso. (2013)
- Worship and Conflict under Colonial Rule: A South Indian Case. Cambridge University Press. (2007)
- Fear of Small Numbers: An Essay on the Geography of Anger. Durham, NC: Duke University Press. (2006)
- Modernity At Large: Cultural Dimensions of Globalization. Minneapolis: University of Minnesota Press. (1996)
- Worship and Conflict Under Colonial Rule: A South Indian Case. Cambridge: Cambridge University Press. (1981)

=== Translations and reprints ===
- Worship and Conflict Under Colonial Rule: A South Indian Case. New Delhi: Orient Longman. (1983: Reprint)
- La Modernidad Desbordada. (Translation of Modernity At Large) Uruguay and Argentina: Ediciones Trilces and Fondo de Cultura Economica de Argentina. (2001)
- Après le colonialisme. Les conséquences culturelles de la globalisation. (Translation of Modernity At Large) Paris: Payot. (2001)
- Modernità in polvere. (Translation of Modernity At Large) Rome: Meltemi Editore.(2001)

=== As Editor ===
- Co-editor (with A. Mack) India's World: The Politics of Creativity in a Globalized Society. (2012)
- Globalization (edited volume). Durham, NC: Duke University Press. (2002)
- Co-editor (with M. Mills and F. Korom, Eds.), Gender, Genre and Power in South Asian Expressive Traditions. Philadelphia: University of Pennsylvania Press. (1991)
- Guest Editor, Special Issue of Cultural Anthropology on "Place and Voice in Anthropological Theory" (Vol. 3, No. 1). (1988)
- Guest Editor (with Carol A. Breckenridge), Special Annual Issue of The India Magazine (New Delhi) on "Public Culture". (1987)
- The Social Life of Things: Commodities in Cultural Perspective (edited volume). New York: Cambridge University Press. (1986)

=== Articles ===
- "The spirit of calculation". The Cambridge Journal of Anthropology, (Vol. 30, No. 1): 3–17. (2012)
- Deep democracy: urban governmentality and the horizon of politics. Environment and Urbanization, (Vol. 13 No. 2), 23–43. (2001)
- "The globalization of archaeology and heritage: a discussion with Arjun Appadurai". Journal of social archaeology, (Vol. 1, No. 1), 35–49. (2001)
- "Grassroots globalization and the research imagination". Public Culture, (Vol.12, no. 1): 1-20.(2000)
- "Spectral housing and urban cleansing: Notes on millenial Mumbai". Public culture, (Vol. 12, no.3): 627–651. (2000)
- "Disjuncture and difference in the global cultural economy". Theory, culture & society, (Vol. 7, No. 2-3): 295–319. (1990)
- "Introduction: Place and voice in anthropological theory". Cultural anthropology, (Vol. 3, No. 1): 16–20. (1988)
- "How to Make a National Cuisine: Cookbooks in Contemporary India". Comparative Studies in Society and History, (Vol. 31, No. 1): 3-24. (1988)
- "Theory in Anthropology: Center and Periphery". Comparative studies in society and history, (Vol. 28, No. 2): 356–374. (1986)
- "On culinary authenticity". Anthropology today, (Vol. 2, No. 4): 25. (1986)
- "Gastro-politics in Hindu South Asia". American ethnologist, (Vol.8, no.3): 494–511. (1981)
- "The past as a scarce resource". Man: 201–219. (1981)
- "Right and left hand castes in South India". The Indian Economic & Social History Review, (Vol.11, No.2-3): 216–259. (1974)

== See also ==
- Commodity Pathway Diversion
