= Context-aware pervasive systems =

Context-aware computing refers to a general class of mobile systems that can sense their physical environment, and adapt their behavior accordingly.

Three important aspects of context are: where you are; who you are with; and what resources are nearby. Although location is a primary capability, location-aware does not necessarily capture things of interest that are mobile or changing. Context-aware in contrast is used more generally to include nearby people, devices, lighting, noise level, network availability, and even the social situation, e.g., whether you are with your family or a friend from school.

== History ==
The concept emerged from ubiquitous computing research at Xerox PARC and elsewhere in the early 1990s. The term 'context-aware' was first used by Schilit and Theimer in their 1994 paper Disseminating Active Map Information to Mobile Hosts where they describe a model of computing in which users interact with many different mobile and stationary computers and classify a context-aware systems as one that can adapt according to its location of use, the collection of nearby people and objects, as well as the changes to those objects over time over the course of the day.

== See also ==
- Ambient intelligence – Electronic devices detecting human presence
- Context awareness – Capability of situational awareness
- Differentiated service (design pattern)
- Locative media – Media of communication functionally bound to a location
- Pervasive computing – Concept in software engineering and computer science
- Spatial contextual awareness – Vicinity data in ubiquitous computing
