= Olivetti Research Laboratory =

English research institute

The Olivetti Research Laboratory (ORL) was a research institute in the field of computing and telecommunications founded in 1986 by Hermann Hauser and Andy Hopper.

== History ==
When Olivetti acquired Acorn Computers in 1985, Hauser, who was Acorn's co-founder, became vice-president for research at Olivetti where he was in charge of laboratories in the US and Europe. In 1986, Hauser co-founded the Olivetti Research Laboratory (ORL) in Cambridge, England, along with Professor Andy Hopper. Hopper became the laboratory's Director.

In 1988, Hauser left Olivetti. In 1997 the lab became the Olivetti & Oracle Research Lab. In January 1999 it was acquired by AT&T Corporation and became AT&T Laboratories Cambridge.

AT&T Laboratories Cambridge was for three years Europe's leading communications engineering research laboratory. The laboratory was internationally recognised as a centre of excellence, undertaking advanced research into communications, multimedia and mobile technologies.

As a result of heavy losses, AT&T restructured its worldwide research efforts and the Cambridge labs closed on 24 April 2002.

== Notable achievements ==
- Original development of VNC and the Remote Framebuffer (RFB) protocol, the desktop sharing technology
- Development and maintenance of the free CORBA implementation for C++ and Python, omniORB
- The Active Badge System for the tracking of people and objects
