= UVL =

UVL may refer to:

- Ultraviolet light
- Undetectable viral load
- United Van Lines, American moving and relocation company
- Unverified List, United States trade restriction list
