= Middle East Eye =

UK–based news organisation

- Type: Online
- Editor-in-chief: David Hearst
- Founded: April 2014; 12 years ago
- Language: English
- Headquarters: 1 Sussex Place, London, England, United Kingdom
- Country: United Kingdom
- Website: middleeasteye.net

Middle East Eye (MEE) is a United Kingdom-based media website and channel that primarily focuses on news related to the Middle East, North Africa, and the broader Muslim world.

The governments of Saudi Arabia, the United Arab Emirates, Egypt, and Bahrain have alleged that the Qatari government covertly funds MEE, a charge which has been denied by the organization.

== History ==
MEE was launched in London, England, in April 2014. It is formally owned by a company called M.E.E. Limited with a single director named Jamal Bessasso. Its editor-in-chief is David Hearst, a former foreign lead writer for The Guardian. It employs about 20 full-time staff in London as of 2017.

According to its critics, MEE began forming in London in 2013; several Al Jazeera journalists subsequently joined the project. Jonathan Powell, a senior executive at Al Jazeera, was a consultant ahead of its launch and registered the website's domain names. Bessasso, a Kuwait-born Palestinian living in London, who lists his nationality as Dutch at Companies House, was the sole director of MEE's parent company M.E.E. Limited, as well as company secretary for a few weeks in 2018. Bessasso was also a former director for the Hamas-controlled Al-Quds TV, which halted its operations in the Gaza Strip and Lebanon due to financial difficulties in 2019. Bessasso is listed as owning more than 75% of the shares and voting rights and has the right to appoint or remove directors. Hearst has denied that Bessasso is the owner of the news site, but refrained from divulging the real owner's identity.

Jamal Khashoggi wrote for MEE prior to joining The Washington Post. According to a post on the MEE website, Khashoggi wrote for them over a period of two years. According to MEE, his op-eds were not credited to him at the time due to concerns for his safety because many of his articles for MEE are critical of Saudi Arabia and its policies, and Saudi Arabia's rift with Qatar.

=== 2020 cyberattack ===
In April 2020, MEE was one of 20 websites targeted by hackers that cybersecurity experts, ESET, were linked to an Israeli surveillance company called Candiru. The website was impacted using a watering hole attack which serves malicious code to certain visitors, allowing the attackers to compromise their PCs.

=== Government blocking ===
According to human-rights monitors, the United Arab Emirates's Telecommunications Regulatory Authority blocked MEE's website nationwide on 29 June 2016 after MEE published reports on the UAE's role in the Yemen war and human-rights issues. In 2016, the United Arab Emirates blocked the MEE countrywide. MEE says it contacted the UAE embassy in London for an explanation, but received no response.

Following protests against the President Abdel Fattah el-Sisi in September and October 2019, Egypt also blocked the website.

In May 2025, Jordan's Media Commission barred/blocked access to MEE (along with other outlets) after they published an investigation alleging that the Jordanian armed forces charged NGOs very high fees to send humanitarian aid to Gaza.

Media organizations (e.g. CPJ) condemned these bans as threats to independent journalism.

== Coverage ==
Middle East Eye covers a range of topics across the Middle East. According to its website, it reports on events in 22 countries. Content is separated into different categories on its website including news, opinion and essays.

Since the foundation of the media outlet, it has provided exclusives on a number of major events in the Middle East, which have often been picked up by other media outlets globally. In early June 2017, an anonymous hacker group began distributing emails to multiple news outlets that they had hacked from the inbox of Yousef Otaiba, the Emirati ambassador in Washington D.C. This included providing details from leaked emails of Saudi crown prince Mohammed bin Salman and American officials. This revelation on 14 August 2017, led to other media outlets printing other material from the leaked emails. According to The New York Times, the hacked emails appeared to benefit Qatar and be the work of hackers working for Qatar, a common subject of the distributed emails.

It often carries anti-Saudi essays.

MEE "added fuel to the fire" around speculations that King Salman of Saudi Arabia would be deposed in 2018 by providing dissident price Khaled bin Farhan a forum to vent his frustrations.

On 29 July 2016, MEE published a story alleging that the government of the United Arab Emirates, aided by Palestinian exile Mohammed Dahlan, had funnelled significant sums of money to conspirators of the 2016 Turkish coup d'état attempt two weeks earlier. In 2017, Dahlan brought a lawsuit of libel against the MEE in a London court seeking damages of up to £250,000. Palestinian politician Mohammed Dahlan dropped his libel claim against MEE and editor David Hearst in 2018, effectively ending the case. In a statement, Dahlan maintained that the story was "fully fabricated" but claimed that he has "achieved his goals in the English courts," and was now planning to sue Facebook in Dublin where the article was "widely published". However, according to MEE and their lawyers, by dropping the claim, Dahlan would be forced to pay all the legal costs, of both parties, estimated to be in excess of £500,000.

Since January 2019, some of Middle East Eye's articles have been translated and distributed in Japanese by AFPBB (Agence France-Presse Japan).

== Reception ==
The governments of Saudi Arabia, the United Arab Emirates, Egypt, and Bahrain have accused the Qatari government of covertly backing MEE. In 2017, MEE denied receiving funds from Qatar stating that the demand was an attempt to "extinguish any free voice which dares to question what they are doing." In a statement responding to the demand, the publication's editor-in-chief said "MEE covers the area without fear or favour, and we have carried reports critical of the Qatari authorities, for instance how workers from the [Indian] subcontinent are treated on building projects for the 2022 World Cup."

On 22 June 2017, during the Qatar diplomatic crisis, Saudi Arabia, the United Arab Emirates (UAE), Egypt, and Bahrain, as part of a list of 13 demands, demanded that Qatar close Middle East Eye, which they saw as sympathetic to the Muslim Brotherhood, Hamas, and a Qatari-funded and aligned outlet.

== Controversies ==
In October 2022, MEE faced scrutiny when it was revealed that Shatha Hammad, a Palestinian Arab journalist associated with the outlet, had made antisemitic remarks on social media in 2014, including praising Adolf Hitler. Following these revelations, MEE terminated its association with Hammad.

== See also ==
- Al-Monitor – Middle East news website
- Asharq Al-Awsat – International Arabic-language newspaper
- Middle East Monitor – Press monitoring organisation
- The New Arab – Pan-Arab media outlet headquartered in London
