= Surveilled =

- Promotional poster
- Directed by: Matthew O'Neill; Perri Peltz
- Written by: Ronan Farrow; Matthew O'Neill; Perri Peltz
- Starring: Ronan Farrow
- Cinematography: Matthew O'Neill
- Edited by: David Meneses
- Production company: HBO Documentary Films
- Distributed by: HBO
- Release dates: November 15, 2024 (DOC NYC); November 20, 2024
- Running time: 59 minutes
- Country: United States
- Language: English

Surveilled is a 2024 documentary film about espionage against the Catalan independence movement, directed by Matthew O'Neill and Perri Peltz, and presented by journalist Ronan Farrow. The preview was at DOC NYC in 2024 and the film was released on November 20 of the same year.

== See also ==
- Catalan independence movement
- Catalangate
- Pegasus (spyware)
