= Entity List =

Trade restriction list published by the United States Department of Commerce

The Entity List is a trade restriction list published by the United States Department of Commerce's Bureau of Industry and Security (BIS), consisting of certain foreign persons, entities, or governments. It is published as Supplement 4 of Part 744 of the Code of Federal Regulations. Entities on the Entity List are subject to U.S. license requirements for the export or transfer of specified items, such as some U.S. technologies. However, U.S. persons or companies are not prohibited from purchasing items from a company on the Entity List. Being included on the Entity List is less severe than being designated a "denied person" and more severe than being placed on the Unverified List (UVL).

First published in 1997 to inform the public on entities involved in disseminating weapons of mass destruction, the list has since expanded to include entities that engaged in "activities sanctioned by the State Department and activities contrary to U.S. national security and/or foreign policy interests". The BIS publishes it at Supplement No. 4 to Part 744 of the Export Administration Regulations (EAR).

== Listed entities ==
The Entity List includes companies and organizations based in countries/regions including China, Venezuela, Russia, Switzerland, Germany, Taiwan, Japan, Myanmar, Singapore, Canada, Iran, Lebanon, Netherlands, Pakistan, South Korea, Turkey, United Arab Emirates, United Kingdom, Greece, Hungary, Ireland, North Macedonia, Israel, and others.

=== China ===
As of July 2024, there were approximately 715 People's Republic of China (PRC) entities on the Entity List. Designated entities consist mainly of companies and research institutions (including universities like Harbin Institute of Technology) involved in military technology, 5G, AI, and other advanced technologies. Dozens of Chinese entities participating in China's military-civil fusion or human rights abuses against Uyghurs are on the list, including companies that make surveillance gear and those that helped the Chinese military to construct artificial islands in the South China Sea.

==== Huawei ====
Notable entities on the Entity List include Huawei, a Chinese telecommunications and consumer electronics manufacturer. Huawei was added to the list in May 2019, with a revision in May 2020 that further tightened sanctions, resulting in it no longer being able to use certain Android software on its smartphones. While Google services are banned in mainland China, consumers outside mainland China are accustomed to Google services, and Huawei's smartphone market share declined as a result.

=== Impact ===
While a primary objective of US Entity List sanction against Chinese firms is to restrict the development of China's high-tech companies, the sanction might have led to unintended results. Research indicates that while the sanctioned firms' normal business operations might have been disrupted in the short term, they are incentivized to strengthen commitment to independent research and development. In particular, companies placed on the Entity List are shown to accelerate their engagement in science in innovation, both as a consumer of science - as reflected in patent citation of scientific literature, and as a producer of science- as reflected in scientific publications.

== History ==
From 1997 to 2007, the entity list was rarely used; it listed approximately 200 companies, mostly in the fields of aerospace, chemicals, logistics, and non-telecommunications technology. Beginning in 2008, the government used the entity list more frequently to address security, trade, and foreign policy concerns. In early 2017, there were approximately 700 listed entities.

In May 2019, Chinese technology company Huawei was listed (sanctions against Huawei were further tightened in May 2020).

In August 2020, five Russian governmental facilities were listed for participating in Russia's chemical and biological weapons programs.

In March 2021, the Biden administration added 14 entities (based in Russia, Switzerland and Germany) to the list for aiding Russia's weapons of mass destruction programs and chemical weapons activities; the listing of the 14 entities followed the addition of 5 Russian governmental facilities to the list in August 2020 for the same grounds.

In late 2020, the list had expanded to almost 1,400 companies.

In March 2021, the Biden administration also announced restrictions on entities in Myanmar in response to the military coup in the country.

In November 2021, Israeli technology companies NSO Group and Candiru were added for supplying spyware to foreign governments that used it to "maliciously target government officials, journalists, businesspeople, activists, academics, and embassy workers", with Positive Technologies (Russia), and Computer Security Initiative Consultancy PTE LTD (Singapore) also listed concurrently on similar grounds.

In September 2025, the second Trump administration adopted a new rule that expands the Entity List to cover majority-owned subsidiaries (≥50%), thereby broadening the license requirements for American exports.

== Responses by China ==
=== Huawei's response and stockpiling ===
Before the September 15, 2020 deadline, Huawei stockpiled "5G mobile processors, Wifi [sic], radio frequency and display driver chips and other components" from key chip suppliers and manufacturers, including Samsung, SK Hynix, TSMC, MediaTek, Realtek, Novatek, and RichWave. On its telecoms business (including 5G) and server business, Huawei has stockpiled 1.5 to 2 years' worth of chips and components. It began massively stockpiling from 2018, when Meng Wanzhou, the daughter of Huawei's founder, was arrested in Canada upon a U.S. request.

=== China's Unreliable Entities List ===
In response to the Entity List, the government of the People's Republic of China announced in May 2019 that it would establish an "unreliable entities" list (UEL). It would allow China to respond to activities that endanger its "national sovereignty, security or development interests" as well as practices such as banning or "discriminating against a Chinese entity in violation of normal market transaction principles," which could cause serious damage. The regulation went into effect in September 2020, after the First Trump administration attempted to ban Chinese apps TikTok and WeChat from American app stores.

Around 2019, the Chinese government warned Dell and Microsoft not to join the ban on the sale of American technology to Chinese companies. In 2020, China was also considering issuing official warnings to Apple and Boeing.

In 2023, Lockheed Martin and Raytheon became the first two companies added to the list. On February 4, 2025, PVH was placed on the list in response to U.S. President Donald Trump's second round of tariffs against China. The company had been under investigation by Chinese regulators for allegedly boycotting cotton from the Xinjiang region. In September 2025, China added three more U.S. companies to the list.

== See also ==
- Export Control Act
- Specially Designated Nationals and Blocked Persons List
