= Jordi Sànchez (politician) =

Catalan political activist (born 1964)

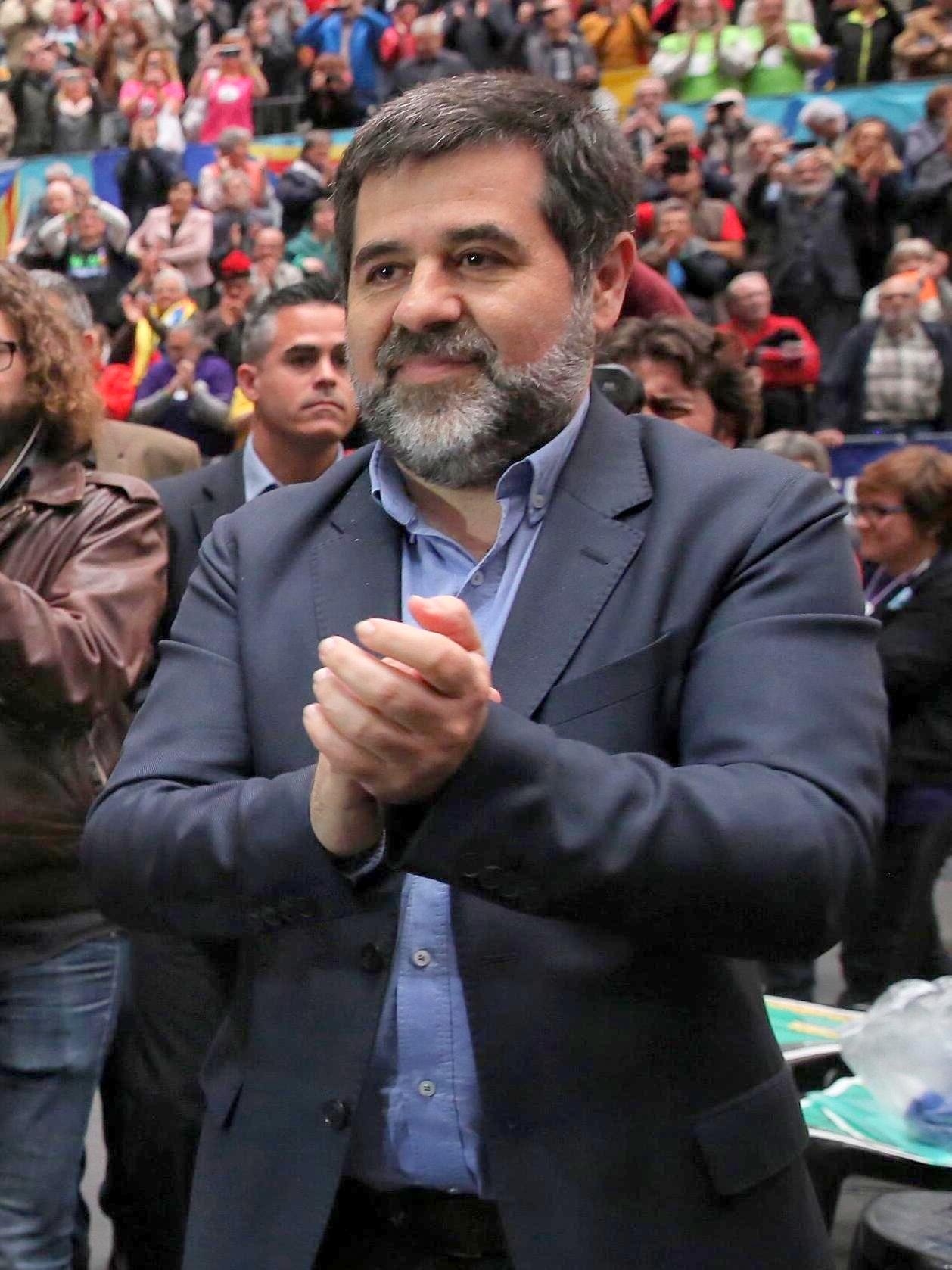
- Jordi Sànchez in 2017

Member of the Congress of Deputies
- In office 20 May 2019 – 24 May 2019 (suspended)
- Constituency: Barcelona

Member of the Parliament of Catalonia for the Province of Barcelona
- In office 17 January 2018 – 18 May 2019 (suspended since 10 July 2018)

President of the Catalan National Assembly
- In office 6 May 2015 – 16 November 2017
- Preceded by: Carme Forcadell
- Succeeded by: Elisenda Paluzie

Personal details
- Born: 1 October 1964 (age 62) Barcelona, Catalonia, Spain
- Party: National Call for the Republic (2019–2020); Together for Catalonia (2020–2023)
- Education: Autonomous University of Barcelona
- Occupation: Political activist
- Known for: President of the Catalan National Assembly amid the 2017–2018 Spanish constitutional crisis

Jordi Sànchez i Picanyol (born 1 October 1964) is a Spanish former politician and activist from Catalonia, who was president of the Catalan National Assembly (ANC) between May 2015 and November 2017.

He was imprisoned in October 2017, accused of sedition in connection with the Catalan independence referendum. In March 2018, following the Catalan regional election in December, he was proposed as candidate for president by the leading pro-independence Together for Catalonia alliance, led by the former president Carles Puigdemont, who was in Belgium. On 10 July 2018 a Supreme Court judge suspended him as a deputy in the Catalan parliament.

During December 2018 he went on a hunger strike in protest against his imprisonment and treatment.

In the 2019 general election he was head of the Together for Catalonia candidacy for the Province of Barcelona. After being elected for the Congress of Deputies, he resigned as member of the Parliament of Catalonia on 18 May 2019. He was sworn in on 20 May 2019, but on 24 May, by a recommendation of the Supreme Court, the Board of the Congress suspended him and other Catalan independence leaders that were elected lawmakers. In October 2019 he was sentenced guilty of sedition by Spanish Supreme Court, and given a nine-year sentence. Amnesty International believes his detention and sentence constituted a disproportionate restriction on his rights to free speech and peaceful assembly.

He was freed in June 2021 following a government pardon.

== Background ==
In 1991, he received a degree in political science from the Autonomous University of Barcelona. A part-time instructor at the University of Barcelona, he has also taught at other universities.

He was the leader and spokesperson, with Àngel Colom, of the Crida a la Solidaritat (Call for Solidarity) from 1983 until its dissolution in June 1993. Linked for many years to Iniciativa per Catalunya Verds, between 1996 and 2004 he was a board member of the Catalan Corporation for Public Broadcasting. In 1996 he was named assistant director of the Jaume Bofill Foundation, and then its director in 2001. He left the foundation in 2010 to take on a position as aide to the Ombudsman of Catalonia, Rafael Ribó, ex-leader of the ICV eco-socialists.

In addition to contributing periodically as an analyst of social and political issues in various media, between 2004 and 2006 he coordinated the creation of one of the five areas of the Pacte Nacional per l'Educació (National Education Accord), specifically the one that laid out the foundations for a public education system. In 2008, he was the coordinator of one of the four areas of the Pacte Nacional per a la Immigració (National Immigration Accord), in particular the part that addressed the need to adapt social services.

== Catalan National Assembly ==
On 16 May 2015, Jordi Sànchez took over the presidency of the ANC from Carme Forcadell, after having been elected by a broad majority of the members of the group's National Board, meeting in Sant Vicenç Hall in the castle at Cardona despite the fact that the candidate who received the most votes from the organization's members was the US-born publisher and writer, Liz Castro. Nevertheless, Sànchez was considered a consensus candidate, and had been supported by the outgoing executive board.

== Imprisonment ==
On 16 October 2017, Jordi Sànchez and Jordi Cuixart were preventively jailed after the state attorney's accusation of sedition, a felony regulated by the article 544 and subsequents of the Spanish Criminal Code.

This sedition was allegedly committed when they organized a protest on 20 September 2017 during Operation Anubis police raids to dismantle the framework of the 1 October Catalan independence referendum performed by the Spanish Civil Guard. They were accused of leading the protest of tens of thousands of people in front of the Catalan economy department heeding a call made by Òmnium Cultural and ANC. The investigating judge stated that the leaders did not call for "peaceful demonstration but to the protection of Catalan officials through 'massive citizens' mobilisations", even though Sànchez and Cuixart made several public calls asking for "peaceful" and "civic" protests in social networks, in a public statement in front of the media at noon and in a speech in front of the demonstrators in the evening. According to the judge, Sànchez encouraged the demonstrators with expressions such as "no one goes home, it will be a long and intense night", on top of a police vehicle. But footage from that night contradicts that and shows Sànchez and Cuixart calling off the protests on top of the car at 11pm: "We are asking you, to the extent possible and in a peaceful way, to dissolve today's gathering". After those calls, most demonstrators left the place and only a few hundred remained. Those were dispersed by crowd-controls units of the autonomous police force of Catalonia, Mossos d'Esquadra. Mossos recognized that there was a risk situation and denounced Spanish Civil Guard didn't notify them in advance of the registries, making it impossible to prepare a police operation to keep demonstrators far from the building.

A sentence of sedition can carry up to 15 years in prison. In July 2018, Sànchez was transferred to a prison in Catalonia. Between December 1 and December 20, 2018, he started a hunger strike in order to 'raise awareness' of unfair treatment by Spain and to denounce Spanish courts' refusal to process numerous appeals in relation to their cases. On February 1, 2019, he was transferred back to a prison in Madrid, expecting trial that started on February the 12th and ended and was remitted to decision on 12 June 2019.

On 14 October 2019 Sànchez was found guilty of sedition and given a nine-year sentence.

=== Reactions ===
After his detention, activists launched a “yellow-ribbon” campaign in support of Jordi Sànchez and other Catalan activists and leaders who are being prosecuted by Spanish justice.

Catalan ex-President Carles Puigdemont and the European Free Alliance referred to Sànchez and Cuixart as "political prisoners". The Spanish Justice Minister Rafael Catalá argued that they were not "political prisoners" but "imprisoned politicians".

Amnesty International issued an official statement considering the charge of sedition and the preventive imprisonment "excessive" and called for their immediate release.

Amnesty International calls on Spanish authorities to drop the charges of sedition and to put an immediate end to their pre-trial detention.

— Amnesty International

Amnesty International does not consider them "prisoners of conscience". Amnesty International avoids the term "political prisoners" because there is no generally accepted definition of the term in international law and because generally speaking the term has many different meanings and interpretations. The term "political prisoners" is only used sporadically by the organisation as a descriptive term in specific cases with a strong political context. Amnesty explicitly avoids the term in cases where it might be confused with the term "prisoner of conscience". The organisation says the two terms should not be confused.

On 19 October, 200,000 people with candles gathered in Avinguda Diagonal, Barcelona and on 21 October, 450,000 joined in Passeig de Gràcia to protest against their imprisonment.

Another demonstration took place on 11 November, after the imprisonment of some members of the Catalan government, and congregated 750,000 people according to the local police.

On 7 March 2018, the Office of the United Nations High Commissioner for Human Rights reminded Spanish authorities that "pre-trial detention should be considered a measure of last resort" referring to Catalan politicians and activists arrested after the independence referendum. And on 23 March it reminded "Under rule 92 of the Committee's rules of procedure, the State party has also been requested to take all necessary measures to ensure that Mr. Jordi Sánchez I Picanyol can exercise his political rights in compliance with article 25 of the Covenant.".

On 8 August 2018, PEN International made another statement asking Spanish authorities to release Cuixart and Sànchez and considered their detentions to be "an excessive and disproportionate restriction on their right to freedom of expression and peaceful assembly".

The World Organisation Against Torture sent an open letter to the president of the Government of Spain Pedro Sánchez as well as the Spanish Attorney General and Spanish Ombudsman on 22 November 2018 demanding the end of the "arbitrary pre-trial detention and judicial harassment of Jordi Sànchez and Jordi Cuixart" and concluded "OMCT considers that the charges against them are unfounded and must therefore be dropped." In December 2018, the International Association of Democratic Lawyers issued a statement requesting the release of 'Catalan political prisoners'.

The day before the beginning of the trial, the Unrepresented Nations and Peoples Organization expressed their support to "those Catalonian activists being trialled" and added "perhaps one of the biggest deficit of justice and deliberate confusion between law and justice, is seen in Catalonia.". On the same day, the European Democratic Lawyers association requested the "immediate" release of the Catalan leaders and expressed their "concern" because of the "lack of procedural guarantees during the trial".

On 29 May 2019, the United Nations Working Group on Arbitrary Detention urged Spain to release Sànchez, Cuixart and Junqueras and to investigate their "arbitrary" detention and the violation of theirs rights, as well as compensating them for the time spent in jail. The Spanish government criticised the report, arguing that the reasoning for their opinion did not take into account some of the alleged crimes. Spain's government issued a statement that raised "doubts" about the group's "independence and impartiality" and called on the U.N. to make sure that its semi-independent working groups are not used "for spurious purposes".

After Sànchez was sentenced to a nine-year sentence, Amnesty International reiterated his petition to immediately release Sànchez and Cuixart and denounced that the "vague" and "overly broad" interpretation of sedition done by the Spanish Supreme Court could have negative effects on the freedom of protest in Spain.

He was finally freed in June 2021 following a government pardon, together with other eight politicians imprisoned in connection with the Catalan independence referendum.
