= Elizabeth Castro =

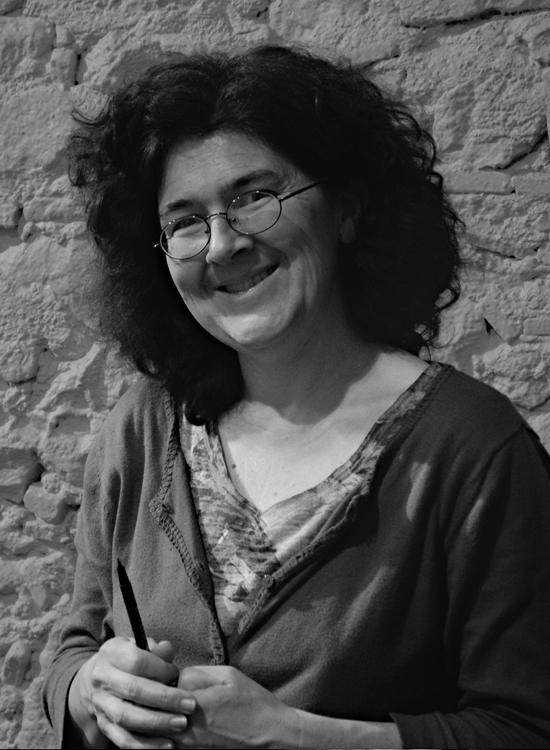
- Castro in 2013
- Occupations: Author; Translator

Elizabeth Castro is an American author and translator. She has written books aimed to educate the reader on particular aspects of website development, such as HTML and Perl. From 1987 to 1993 Castro lived in Barcelona and managed the translation of computer programs. In 1993 she moved back to the United States to write books about using the internet and World Wide Web.

Currently based in Barcelona, she has also been active in the Catalan independence movement, promoting the cause in the English language sphere with her latest and most notable project being What's up with Catalonia?, with authors like Josep Maria Ganyet, among many others.

On May 9, 2015, she was the most voted candidate in the elections to the National Secretary of the Catalan National Assembly, the grassroots movement for Catalan independence, and currently is its International Committee Chair.

== Publications ==
=== Books ===
As of 2010, all of her English language books have been published through Peachpit Press, in their 'Visual Quickstart Guide' or 'Visual Quickproject Guide' formats. These books give example code and illustrations followed by explanations designed to teach related concepts.

HTML

- HTML for the World Wide Web. Peachpit Press. January 1996. ISBN 0-201-88448-8.
- HTML for the World Wide Web (2nd ed.). Peachpit Press. February 1997. ISBN 0-201-68862-X.
- HTML 4 for the World Wide Web (3rd ed.). Peachpit Press. May 1998. ISBN 0-201-69696-7.
- HTML 4 for the World Wide Web (Fourth ed.). Peachpit Press. October 1999. ISBN 0-201-35493-4.
- HTML for the World Wide Web, 5th Edition, with XHTML and CSS. Peachpit Press. September 2002. ISBN 0-321-13007-3.
- HTML for the World Wide Web, 5th Edition, with XHTML and CSS, Student Edition. Peachpit Press. February 2003. ISBN 0-321-15068-6.
- Creating a Web Page with HTML. Peachpit Press. August 2004. ISBN 0-321-27847-X.
- HTML, XHTML & CSS (Sixth ed.). Peachpit Press. August 2006. ISBN 0-321-43084-0.
- HTML5 and CSS3 (Seventh ed.). Peachpit Press. December 2011. ISBN 978-0-321-71961-4.
- HTML5 and CSS3, Seventh Edition, with DVD QuickStart Video. Peachpit Press. January 2012. ISBN 978-0-321-81539-2.

Netscape

- Netscape 2 for Windows. Peachpit Press. May 1996. ISBN 0-201-88615-4.
- Netscape 2 for Macintosh. Peachpit Press. June 1996. ISBN 0-201-88631-6.
- Netscape 3 for Macintosh. October 1996. ISBN 0-201-69408-5.
- Netscape 3 for Windows. November 1996. ISBN 0-201-69409-3.
- Netscape Communicator 4 for Windows. October 1997. ISBN 0-201-68864-6.
- Netscape Communicator 4 for Macintosh. November 1997. ISBN 0-201-68886-7.

Perl and CGI

- Perl and CGI for the World Wide Web. November 1998. ISBN 0-201-35358-X.
- Perl and CGI for the World Wide Web (Second ed.). June 2001. ISBN 0-201-73568-7.

XML

- XML for the World Wide Web. Peachpit Press. November 2000. ISBN 0-201-71098-6.

Blogger

- Publishing a Blog with Blogger. Peachpit. February 2005. ISBN 0-321-32123-5.
- Publishing a Blog with Blogger (Second ed.). Peachpit Press. November 2009. ISBN 978-0-321-63752-9.

iPhoto

- Creating a Photo Book and Slideshow with iPhoto 5. Peachpit. June 2005. ISBN 0-321-35752-3.

EPUB

- EPUB Straight to the Point: Creating ebooks for the Apple iPad and other ereaders. Peachpit Press. August 2010. ISBN 978-0-321-73468-6.
- Fixed Layout EPUBs for iPad and iPhone: Straight to the Point Miniguide (eBook only). February 2011.

Castro continues to release miniguide updates to her well-received EPUB guide.

Matthew Diener, editor of EPUBsecrets reviewed her fourth miniguide, praising how Castro takes the reader through the steps to make the "conversion to ePUB easier and better." He lists ways that this miniguide aids users in placement and insertion of images and media, as well as preparing ePUBS to be used for Kindle editions. Diener also is pleased that the miniguides are "DRM free. This means you can actually "crack these ePUBs" and take a look at the files that make up her books. This will allow you to see everything she does to make her ePUBs appear the way they do." Joel Friedlander in The Book Designer said, "Liz Castro has cracked the code on creating beautiful, functional ebooks...Liz Castro's EPUB Straight to the Point is a fantastic resource with clear instruction and should be in the ereader of anyone whose work involves dealing with EPUB and iBooks." Adam C. Engst, Contributing Editor at MacUser, MacWEEK, and Macworld, in his e-newsletter TidBITS called Castro's site for iPhoto book themes "a wonderfully useful Web site".

Politics

- Liz Castro, ed. (February 2013). What's up with Catalonia?. Catalonia Press. ISBN 978-1-61150032-5.

Other

- Elizabeth Castro (1992). Faxivisa: la realidad sobre la compra por correo de material informático a Estados Unidos [The Reality of Ordering Computer Equipment by Mail from the United States]. Página Uno. ISBN 84-88004-08-7.

== Awards ==
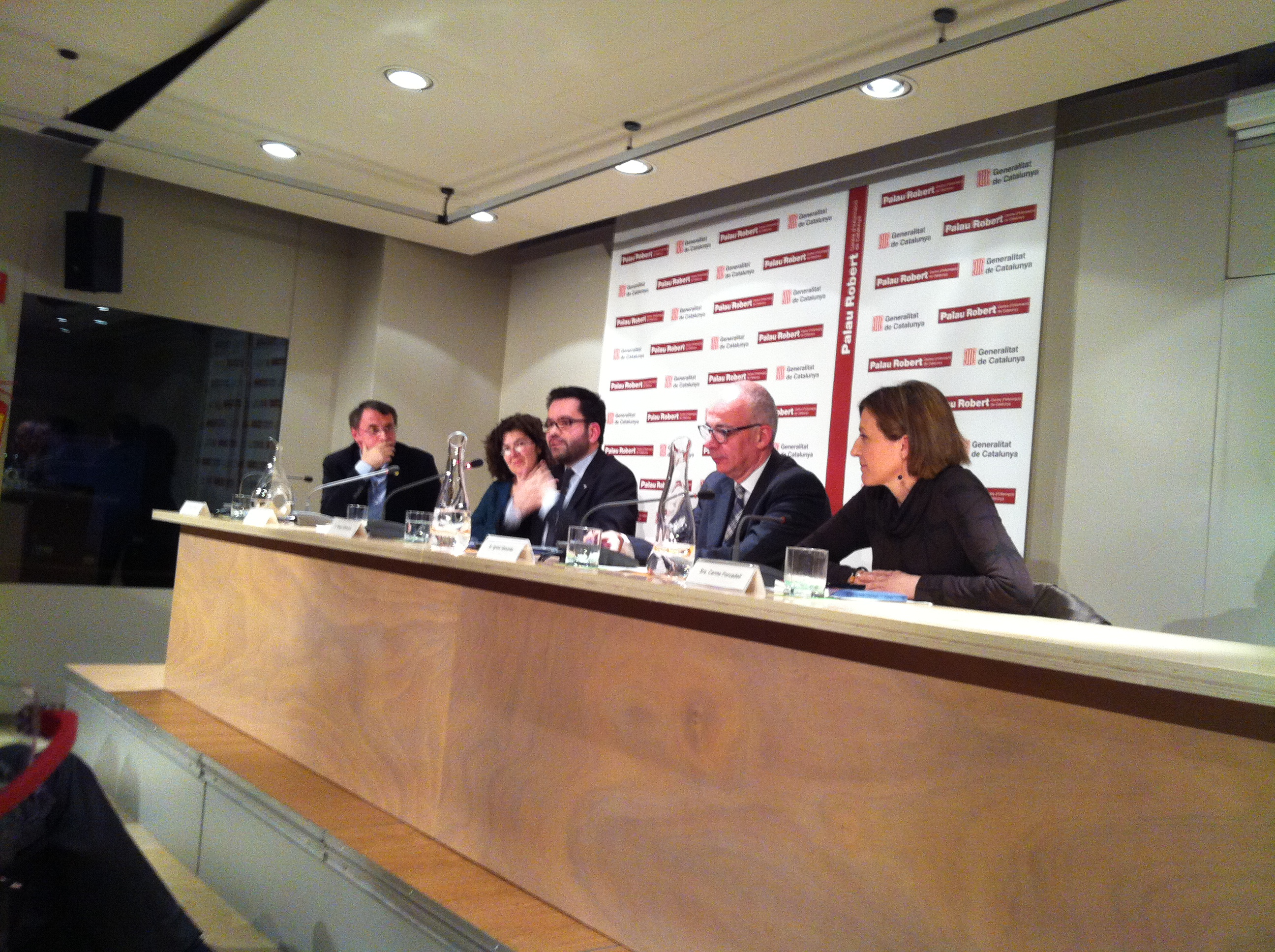
Castro during one of her books' premiere

From Òmnium Cultural, Dec 16, 2011: The jury of the 25th Joan B. Cendrós Prize has awarded the prize for her work about Catalonia published outside of Catalonia to the American publisher Liz Castro. Castro, a writer living in Massachusetts, has become known in the last few years for her work promoting Catalonia and talking about its linguistic, cultural, and political situation through her publishing house, Catalonia Press, as well as the internet, where she reports on Catalan news in English. In 2014 she received one of the Batista i Roca Award - Enric Garriga Trullols Memorial, granted by the Institut de Projecció Exterior de la Cultura Catalana.
