= Kelly Goto =

American entrepreneur

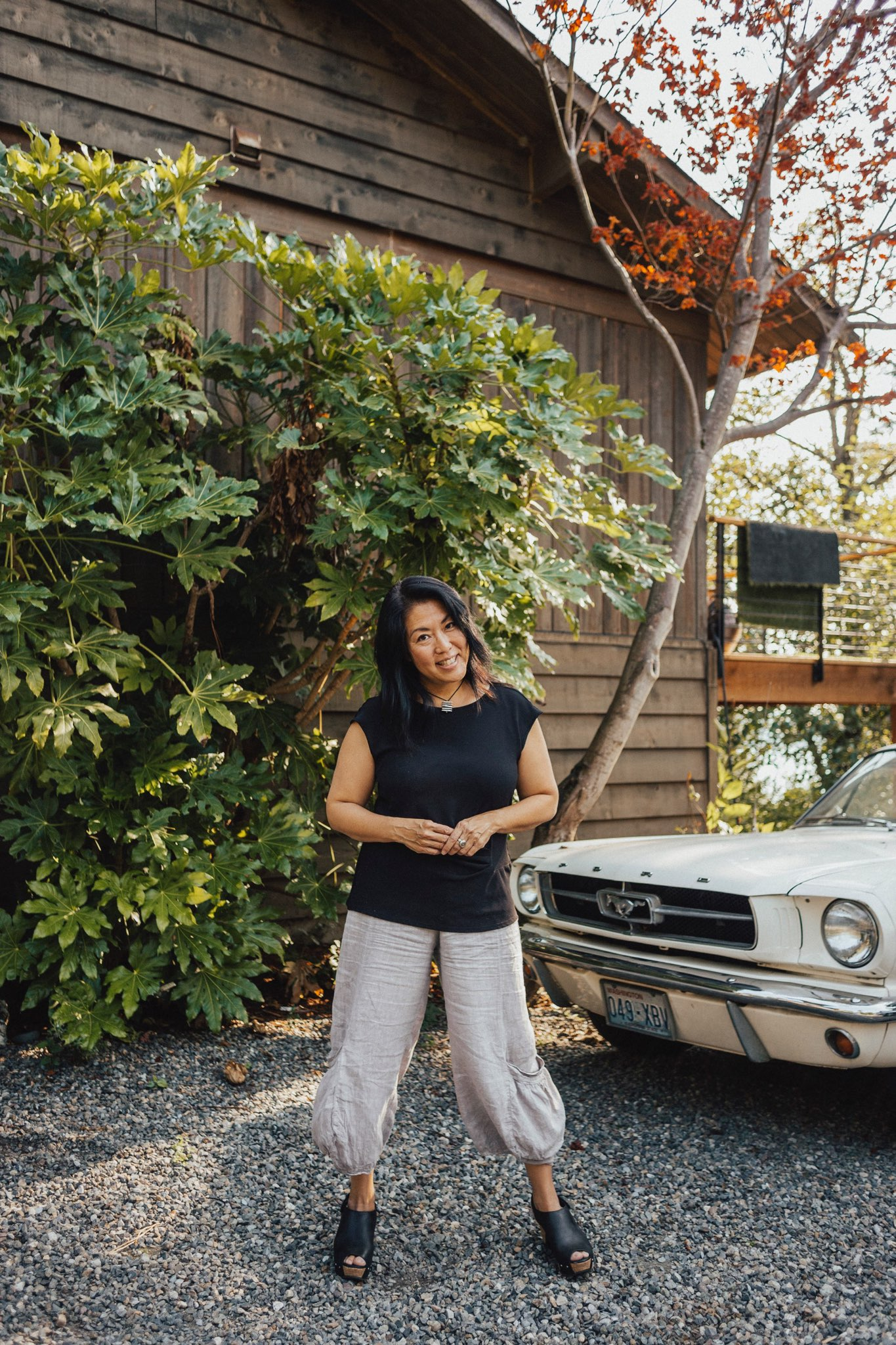
- Born: Seattle, Washington
- Education: University of California, Los Angeles
- Known for: Design Ethnography, User Experience, User Research, Universal and Inclusive Design

Kelly Goto is an American entrepreneur specializing in user experience design and contextual research. She was one of the first design researchers using design ethnography. She is the founder and principal at gotomedia and gotoresearch.

== Education and early life ==
Goto was born in Seattle, Washington, and moved to Mercer Island, Washington in her early childhood. She got her first freelance design contracts in fifth grade. She studied radio, television and film at Northwestern University and obtained her bachelors of arts in communications from the University of California, Los Angeles in 1992.

== Career and research ==
Goto was hired as a senior producer of Warner Bros' online division in Los Angeles 1995, which was the first online presence of a major film studio. She moved to San Francisco, California in 1999 to become creative director at Red Eye Digital Media, which later became Idea Integration. As creative director she became more interested in the intersection of user experience and design, and was an early proponent of usability testing on the internet. Goto founded gotomedia in 2001 in San Francisco, which initially focused on user experience on the web, and later expanded to mobile design and to multi-faceted user-design for technology, health care, education and other sectors. Goto was the president of the AIGA Brand Experience in 2006–2007. She founded gotoresearch in 2015, which conducts user centered research based drawing from design thinking and ethnographic research methods.

Goto is known for her book originally published in 2002 with collaborator Emily Cotler, Web Redesign: Workflow that Works. The book, which has been translated into 14 languages and has used in university curricula, argues that the creation of the ideal user experience is an iterative process, and provides practical advice on project workflow and redesign strategies.

Goto emphasizes diversity in her approach to user design research, focusing on both cross-cultural design and universal and inclusive design, particularly focusing on how to understand and create the best user experiences for people of color, older people, women, and people with disabilities. She was one of the earliest proponents of design ethnography, using methods such as diary studies, and has spoken and written on this topic since the early 2000s. She also is involved in international and cross-national user design research and has led organizations around the world in design thinking workshops.

== Personal life ==
Kelly lives in a multigenerational Japanese-American household with her mother and two daughters in the Seattle area.
