= Unverified List =

United States trade restriction

The Unverified List (UVL) is a trade restriction list published by the United States Department of Commerce's Bureau of Industry and Security (BIS), consisting of certain foreign persons, entities, or governments. Inclusion in the UVL is commonly confused with listings in the similar but separate Entity List or Specially Designated Nationals and Blocked Persons List.

Inclusion in UVL is not regarded as punitive nor intended to punish a party for violating laws or regulations. Rather, "Foreign persons who are parties to an export, re-export, and (in-country) transfer subject to the EAR may be added to the Unverified List if the BIS or federal officials acting on its behalf cannot verify the bona fides (i.e., legitimacy and reliability about the end-use and end-user of items subject to the EAR) of such persons because an end-use check, such as a pre-license check (PLC) or a post-shipment verification (PSV), cannot be satisfactorily completed for reasons outside of the U.S. Government's control."

The UVL is regulated by 15 CFR Ch. VII § 744.15 and may be found in Supplement No. 6 to Part 744. Changes to the UVL are published along with all other US government business in the Federal Register and codified annually along with all other federal regulations.

== Effect ==
Exporters can no longer seek license exemptions for items subject to the Export Administration Regulations (EARs) for exports to any foreign persons, entities, or governments listed in the UVL. In addition, exporters of items subject to EARs that do not require a license must obtain a UVL statement from the listed entity and file an Automated Export System record for all exports.

In contrast, entities listed on the SDN list are barred completely from any transactions with the U.S., and an export license is required for any and all items subject to EARs for entities listed on the Entity List.

== Delisting ==
The BIS typically administers delisting requests from entities listed on the UVL. The BIS removes listings from the UVL when the BIS can verify the bona fides of the listed person as an end-user, consignee, or another party to exports, reexports, or transfers (in-country) involving items subject to the EAR by completing a pre-license check (PLC) or a post-shipment verification (PSV).

In contrast, removal of entities from the Entity List is administered by the End-User Review Committee (ERC), which is composed of representatives from the Departments of Commerce (chair), State, Defense, Energy, and where appropriate, the Treasury.
