= Josep Maria Ganyet =

Catalan computer engineer

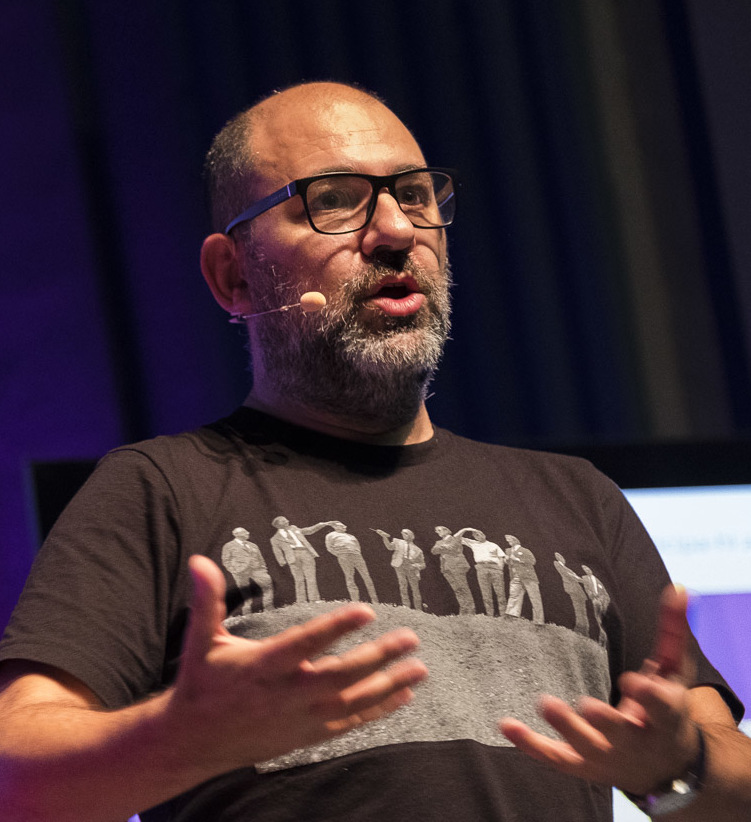
- Ganyet in 2017
- Born: Josep Maria Ganyet i Cirera; 1965 (age 60–61); Tàrrega, Urgell, Catalonia (Spain)
- Occupation: computer engineer

Josep Maria Ganyet i Cirera (Tàrrega, Catalonia, 1965) is a Catalan computer engineer. Graduated from the Autonomous University of Barcelona in 1988, he then specialized in artificial intelligence.

He began his career with IBM and Deutsche Bank in designing human interactions. He also worked with online advertising agency El Sindicato (now part of Havas) and created the website Hoymesiento.com. In 1994 founded his first Internet company, Ars Virtualis. Currently, he is CEO and co-founder of Mortensen.co study and participates in the start-up Soundkik. In parallel, he is professor of new media studies of the Audiovisual Communication degree at the Pompeu Fabra University. He collaborates in radio broadcasting show El món a RAC 1, La Vanguardia and Barcelona TV, and works with Kelly Goto at Gotomedia. In 1998 he published the book Interacción humana con los ordenadores (UOC).

He is also known for creating the 2012 campaign Keep Calm and Speak Catalan, based on the poster keep calm and carry on, against the education reform project undertaken by the Spanish Minister of Education, José Ignacio Wert (after its threat to "hispanize Catalan students"), a fact considered by most of the Catalan parliamentary spectrum as a threat to education in Catalan language.
