= First Wap =

Spyware developer

First Wap is a surveillance technology company run by executives based in Germany and Austria, and registered in Jakarta, Indonesia.

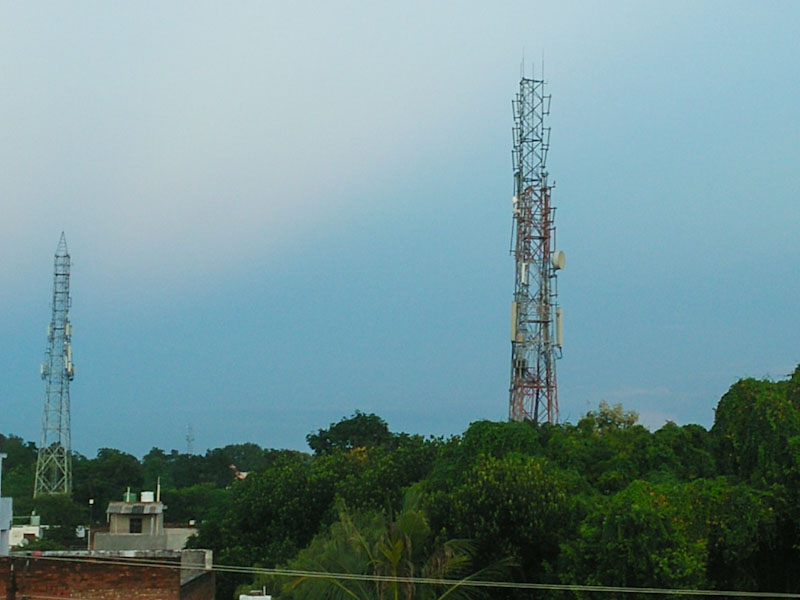
A mobile phone network tower, which could be used to geolocate victims of First Wap's Altamides software.

== Overview ==
First Wap was founded by Josef Fuchs sometime before 1999, while he was living in Jakarta. WAP stands for wireless application protocol. The company was founded as a bulk SMS provider, but pivoted to selling surveillance software early on. The company found Indonesia's export controls for surveillance technology to be relaxed compared to Europe or The United States.

== Advanced Location Tracking and Mobile Information and Deception System (Altamides) ==
Altamides is a telecom-network surveillance system that First Wap develops, markets, and sells; it is their primary product offering. Investigative journalists at Lighthouse Reports, discovered a dataset of 1.5 million rows on the dark web that led to the discovery of Altamides by the press.

=== Reporting ===
Lighthouse, in conjunction with additional reporting partners such as Mother Jones, Der Spiegel, and others, conducted an undercover operation wherein they sent reporters to ISS World Training, a surveillance conference, and posed as a consultancy investigating software for their clients. The undercover journalists asked about a fictitious mining company that wanted to surveil activists who might interfere with mining operations. Executives from First Wap stated on camera that their software could help identify who the activists are and then track them.

One executive from First Wap, Guenther Rudolph, stated on video in response to the undercover journalists' questions about their fictitious clients "I am not even allowed to know about the project. Because otherwise I can go to prison." Despite this, the First Wap executives went on to explain that while they couldn't legally sell the software directly in that use case, they could make the sale "through Jakarta, with the signature coming from our Indian general manager” to subvert the legal restrictions in place.

==== Fallout from reporting ====
Telecom Liechtenstein suspended their business relationship with First Wap soon after the Lighthouse reporting was published. First Wap had been using their access to Telecom Liechtenstein's network to route much of the queries their software made on global telecom networks.

=== Capabilities ===
According to First Wap executives, Altamides can track a mobile phone's location, listen to incoming and outgoing calls, access incoming and outgoing SMS messages, and even access WhatsApp chats "easily", despite their encryption.

Because Altamides is able to intercept SMS messages, it provides users the ability to gain access to victims' user accounts, even bypassing multi-factor authentication.

The software uses security vulnerabilities in telephone networks, specifically in Signalling System 7, to track mobile phones via queries made to appear as legitimate to the phone networks.

=== Victims ===
The dataset that kicked off the investigation contained many instances of spying on people in the United States — "despite the country usually being off-limits for surveillance technology vendors wary of US sanctions." The dataset led the reporting team to uncover that employees of defense contractor Raytheon, the CEO of 23andMe, Anne Wojcicki, and actor Jared Leto had all been tracked while on US soil. Additionally the dataset revealed that, among many others, the following people had been tracked:

- Gianluigi Nuzzi while reporting on a scandal at the Vatican
- Adam Ciralsky former CIA officer and journalist
- Hamad bin Jassim bin Jaber Al Thani, Prime Minister of Qatar
- Asma al-Assad, former First Lady of Syria
- Nigerian election officials were tracked prior to Nigeria's 2011 election
- Founders of Rwandan National Congress: exiled Rwandan General Faustin Kayumba and a bodyguard for the Head of Rwandan Intelligence, Patrick Karegeya

== See also ==
- Pegasus (Spyware)
- HackingTeam
- List of spyware programs
