= Elisenda Paluzie =

President of the Catalan National Assembly

Professor Elisenda Paluzie Ph.D.
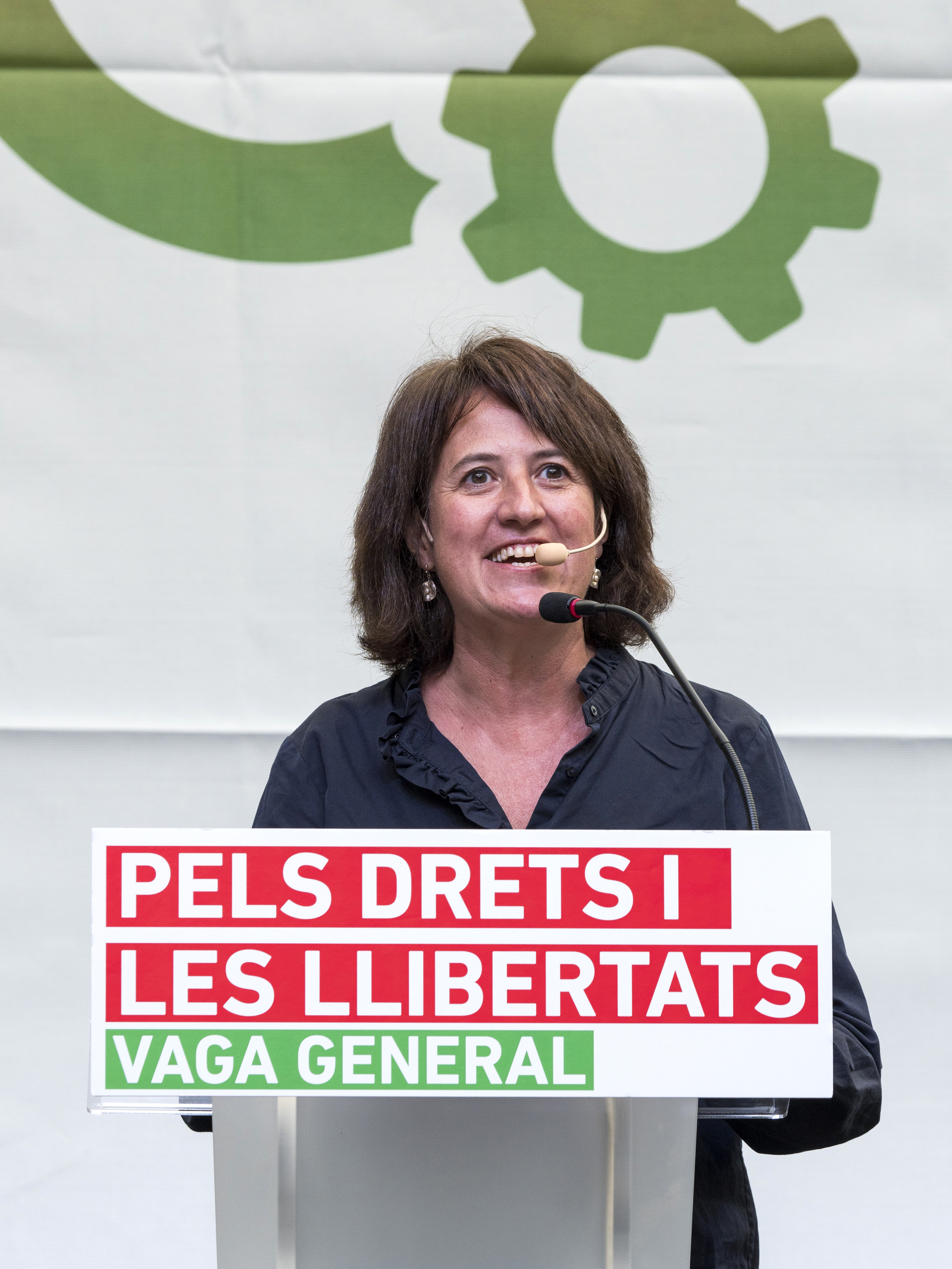
- Paluzie at a strike in 2019

President of the Catalan National Assembly
- In office 24 March 2018 – 21 May 2022
- Preceded by: Jordi Sànchez
- Succeeded by: Dolors Feliu

Personal details
- Born: 13 October 1969 (age 56) Barcelona, Catalunya, Spain
- Party: Republican Left of Catalonia (2018-2022)
- Parent: Lluís Paluzie i Mir (father)
- Education: London School of Economics; Universitat de Barcelona; Yale University; École des ponts ParisTech
- Occupation: Economist, activist and politician
- Awards: Catalan Award of Economy

Elisenda Paluzie i Hernández (born 13 October 1969) is a Catalan economist, politician, and professor from Spain. Since 24 March 2018 she is president of the Assemblea Nacional Catalana, a Catalan independence organization. She has served as Professor of Economics at the University of Barcelona since 2001, is the director of the Centro de Análisis Económico y de las Políticas Sociales ("Center for Economic Analysis and Social Policy") there, which is integrated into the Research Institute of the Barcelona Economic Analysis Team.

In 2022, she was elected as a vice president of the Unrepresented Nations and Peoples Organization.

== Early years and education ==
Elisenda Paluzie was born in Barcelona on 13 October 1969. She is the daughter of Lluís Paluzie Mir, who comes from a family of Catalan intellectuals. She received a bachelor's degree in economics from the University of Barcelona (1992), a master's degree in international economics and economic development from Yale University (1996) and a Ph.D. in economics from the University of Barcelona (1999). She obtained a pre-doctoral scholarship from La Caixa to train at the London School of Economics (1997-1998) as well as scholarships for postdoctoral stays at the London School of Economics (2000-2001), CERAS, and École des ponts ParisTech (2002-2003). During her student years, she was the secretary of finance of the National Federation of Students of Catalonia (1989-1994).

== Career ==
A promoter of the Sobirania i Progrés independence platform since 2006, she later joined the Republican Left of Catalonia party (2008-2012), where she promoted the critical current, Independentist Left. On 24 March 2018 she was elected president of the Catalan National Assembly succeeding Jordi Sànchez.

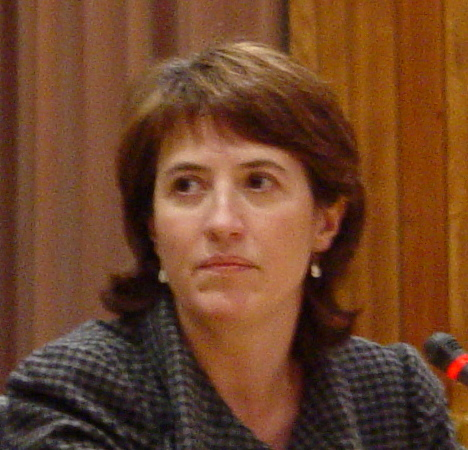
2009

In February 2009, she was elected Dean of the Faculty of Economics and Business of the University of Barcelona, a position she held until April 2017.

In October 2014, she published the book, Podemos! Las claves de la viabilidad económica de la Cataluña independiente ("Podemos! The keys to the economic viability of independent Catalonia"), edited by Rosa de los Vientos. The work was awarded the XIV Catalonia Economy Prize, awarded by the Catalan Society of Economy, a subsidiary of the Institute of Catalan Studies, in November 2015.

In March 2022, she was elected vice-president of the Unrepresented Nations and Peoples Organization.
