= Phone surveillance =

Monitoring on phone conversations and data

Phone surveillance is the act of performing surveillance on phone conversations, location tracking, and data monitoring of a phone. Before the era of mobile phones, these used to refer to the tapping of phone lines via a method called wiretapping. Wiretapping has now been replaced by software that monitors the cell phones of users.

While mobile phone surveillance has been carried out by large organizations for a long time (e.g., to find clues of illegal activities), more and more of such surveillance is now carried out by individuals for personal reasons. For example, a parent may become a "text spy" to monitor a child's texting activity. This brings in the moral, ethical and legal question of who owns people's privacy.

== Prevalence ==
According to a 2007 American Management Association report, computer monitoring takes form ranges from keyboard (45%), files (43%), blogosphere (12%) to social networking sites (10%). No newer data is available on the number of phone surveillance carried out currently.

The global phone tracking application market size was valued at around $0.17 billion in 2024 and is expected to grow at a CAGR of around 12.3% until 2032.

== Phone surveillance software ==
Phone surveillance is now more commonly carried out on cell phones. This has become increasingly easy with the availability of cell phone monitoring software. These types of software are easily purchased over the internet and can be quickly installed on phones. There have been questions as to whether this software is illegal; software makers may show a disclaimer that they do not endorse any illegal activities.

== Stopping phone surveillance ==
The law has yet to set a clear boundary on who can or who cannot do phone surveillance. A 2005 federal court ruling denies the FBI from tracking cellphone locations of people who have not committed any crimes.

== U.S. intelligence ==
An arm of the U.S. military, the United States Defense Intelligence Agency (DIA), has been tracking the location of Americans by searching through databases that it purchases from mobile phone companies. The phone companies routinely collect and store their customers' cellular telephone location data when the customers use certain software applications. Additional government agencies that use such tactics to track people and arrest them include the U.S. Immigration and Customs Enforcement and United States Customs and Border Protection.

== See also ==
- Cellphone surveillance
- Mass surveillance
- Surveillance § Telephones
- Telephone tapping
