= Jon Iñarritu =

Spanish politician

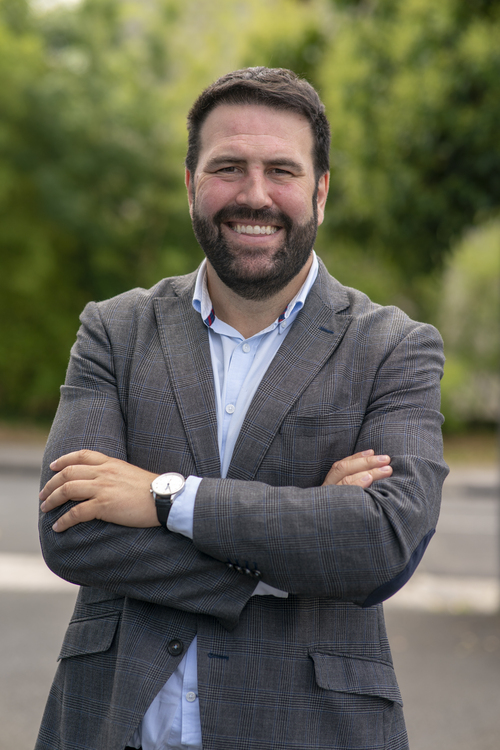
- Jon Iñarritu in 2023

Member of the Congress of Deputies of Spain
- Incumbent
- Assumed office 14 May 2019
- Constituency: Gipuzkoa
- In office 12 December 2011 – 13 January 2016
- Constituency: Biscay

Member of the Senate of Spain
- In office 15 December 2016 – 4 March 2019
- Succeeded by: Idurre Bideguren
- Constituency: Basque Country

Personal details
- Born: Jon Iñarritu Gartzia; 28 March 1979 (age 47) Leioa, Basque Country, Spain
- Party: EH Bildu
- Education: University of the Basque Country; Pierre Mendès-France University

Jon Iñarritu Gartzia (born 28 March 1979) is a Basque politician and a deputy of the Congress of Deputies of Spain since 2019. He was previously a member of the Senate of Spain between 2016 and 2019 and a deputy of the Congress of Deputies between 2011 and 2016.

== Early life ==
Iñarritu was born on 28 March 1979 in Leioa, Basque Country. He has a law degree from the University of the Basque Country and a master's degree in international and European law from the Pierre Mendès-France University.

He speaks Spanish, Basque, English, French and Hebrew and is fluent in Catalan and Galician.

== Career ==
Iñarritu was a founding member of Aralar and vice president of Eurobaskek (Basque Council of the European Movement). He contested the 2011 general election as an Amaiur electoral alliance candidate in the Province of Biscay and was elected to the Congress of Deputies. At the 2015 general election he was placed 2nd on the EH Bildu electoral alliance's list of candidates in the Province of Biscay but the alliance only managed to win one seat in the province and as a result he failed to get re-elected to the Congress of Deputies.

At the 2016 general election Iñarritu was placed 3rd on the EH Bildu's list of candidates in the Province of Biscay but the party only managed to win one seat in the province and as a result he failed to get re-elected to the Congress of Deputies. In December 2016 he was appointed to the Senate of Spain by the Basque Parliament.

Iñarritu contested the 2019 general election as an EH Bildu electoral alliance candidate in the Province of Gipuzkoa and was re-elected to the Congress of Deputies.

== Electoral history ==
Electoral history of Jon Iñarritu
Election	Constituency	Party	Alliance	No.	Result
2011 general	Province of Biscay	Aralar	Amaiur	2	Elected
2015 general	Province of Biscay	Aralar	EH Bildu	2	Not elected
2016 general	Province of Biscay	Aralar	EH Bildu	3	Not elected
2019 general	Province of Gipuzkoa		EH Bildu	2	Elected
