= Jam (disambiguation) =

Jam is a type of fruit preserve.

Jam or Jammed may also refer to:

== Other common meanings ==
- A firearm malfunction
- Block signals
  - Radio jamming
  - Radar jamming and deception
  - Mobile phone jammer
  - Echolocation jamming

== Arts and entertainment ==
=== Music ===
- The Jam, an English band, late 1970s-early 1980s
- JAM Project, a Japanese animation music group
- Judy and Mary, a Japanese band
- Jam (album), by Little Angels
- "Jam" (Michael Jackson song)
- "Jam" (The Yellow Monkey song)
- "Jam (Turn It Up)", a song by Kim Kardashian
- Jam, improvise music in a jam session
- "Jam", a song by the Human League from Crash
- "Jjam", a song by Stray Kids from Ate
- Jammed (album), a 2004 studio album by The Church

=== Other ===
- Jam (film), a 2006 film by Craig E. Serling
- Jam (novel), a 2010 novel by Ben "Yahtzee" Croshaw
- Jam (TV series), UK
- Jam Kuradoberi, a character in the Guilty Gear game series
- The Jam (comics), by Bernie Mireault
- HBO Kids, formerly known as "Jam" from 2001 until 2016
- Jam Films, a collection of short films

== Codes ==
- Jamaica (ISO country code: JAM)
- Jamaican Patois (SO 639-3: jam), an English-based creole language

== Computing ==
- JAM (disk compression), DOS disk compression software by JAM Software
- JAM Message Base Format
- Perforce Jam, a software building tool
- .jam, a file type for JAM/STAPL, a Standard Test and Programming Language

== Media ==
- BBC Jam, an online educational service
- Jam!, a Canadian entertainment news site
- Jam 88.3, branding of DWJM, a radio station in Metro Manila
- Jam 96.3, branding of WJAM, a radio station in Selma, Alabama
- JamRadio, the student radio station of the University of Hull, England

== Organisations ==
- JAM (trade union), a manufacturing trade union in Japan
- JAM Creative Productions, a jingle company in Texas, US
- JAM Productions (company), a short-lived computer game development company
- Naughty Dog, formerly JAM Software Inc., first-party video game developer in California US
- Jamaat al Muslimeen, an Islamist terrorist organization in Trinidad and Tobago
- Jaish al Mahdi or Mahdi Army, an Iraqi military force created by Muqtada al-Sadr

== People ==
- Jam (title), various rulers in India and Pakistan
- Jam Handy (1886–1983), American swimmer and film producer
- Jam Miller (born 2004), American football player
- Jam Rahuoja Rostron, English musician

== Places ==
=== Iran ===
- Jam County, Bushehr Province
  - Jam, Iran, a city
  - Jam Rural District
- Jam, Khuzestan, a village
- Jam, Semnan, a village

=== Elsewhere ===
- Jamrud or Jam, Khyber Agency, Pakistan
- Jám or Iam, Berlişte Commune, Caraş-Severin County, Romania
- Jam River, Madhya Pradesh, India
  - Jam Dam
- Minaret of Jam, Afghanistan

== Sports ==
- Jam, a round in a roller derby game
- Long Beach Jam (2003–2005) and Bakersfield Jam (2006–2016), later Northern Arizona Suns, a basketball team

== Other uses ==
- Jam., an abbreviation for the Epistle of James
- Jam or Jamshid, a mythological figure of Greater Iranian culture and tradition
- JAM Liner, a bus company in the Philippines
- Joint Admission Test for M.Sc., an Indian admission test
- Junctional adhesion molecule, a protein that in humans is encoded by the JAM2 gene
- Jut Art Museum, a museum in Taipei, Taiwan
- Time in Jamaica, shortened to JAM, official time of Jamaica, UTC−5

== See also ==
- Traffic jam or traffic congestion
- Log jam
- Jams (disambiguation)
- Jamming (disambiguation)
- Jamb (disambiguation)
