= Jamming =

Jamming (or variants) may refer to:

== General ==
- Jamming (knot), becoming difficult to untie
- Interfering with communications or surveillance:
  - Radio jamming
  - Radar jamming and deception
  - Mobile phone jammer
  - Echolocation jamming
  - Radio-controlled improvised explosive device jamming, a counter-IED technique
- Jamming (physics), an apparent change of physical state
- Jamming (climbing), a technique
- Jamming (weapon), a firearm malfunction

== TV and radio ==
- Culture jamming, criticizing mass media through its own methods
- Jammin' (radio programme), BBC Radio 2 musical comedy show that aired since 2001
- Jammin, original version of TV series Kickin' It with Byron Allen 1992
- Jammin (2006 TV series), Sí TV reality television series that aired from 2006 to 2008

== Music and dance ==
- Jammin, an alias of DJ Zinc
- Jam session, a semi-improvised rock or jazz performance
- Jamming (dance), cheered show-offs during social dancing
- Jamming!, a UK music fanzine of the 1970s–80s created by Tony Fletcher
- Jamming, dancehall reggae album by Frankie Paul, 1991
- "Jammin'" (Andrews Sisters song), debut hit song of the Andrews Sisters, 1937
- "Jamming" (song), by Bob Marley, 1977
- "Master Blaster (Jammin')", a song by Stevie Wonder, 1980

== See also ==
- Jam (disambiguation)
- Jammer (disambiguation)
