= Jammer =

Jammer may refer to:

== Signal blocking devices ==
- Radar jammer, a device used in radar jamming and deception
- Radio jammer, a device used in radio jamming
- Radio-controlled Improvised Explosive Device jammer, a counter-IED device
- Mobile phone jammer, an instrument used to prevent cellular phones from receiving signals from base stations

== Sports ==
- Jammer (American football), a special teams position
- Jammer (mascot), mascot of the Northern League Joliet Jackhammers
- Jammer (swimwear), a type of male competitive swimwear
- Jammer, the scoring position in roller derby
- Jamestown Jammers, a minor league baseball team

== People ==
- Jammer (rapper) (born 1982), English rapper and producer
- Daniel Jammer (born 1966), Jewish German-Israeli businessman and entrepreneur
- Max Jammer (1915–2010), Israeli physicist and Rector and Acting President of Bar-Ilan University
- Quentin Jammer (born 1979), American retired National Football League player

== Entertainment ==
- The Jammers, American electronic music studio group
- Jammers, a term used for players of Animal Jam Classic
- Jammers, a group of characters in the TV series The Prisoner who use misdirection to confuse onlookers with misinformation

== See also ==
- Red Jammers, buses used to shuttle guests around Glacier National Park
- Jamming (disambiguation)
