= Dirtbox (cell phone) =

Electronic surveillance device

A dirtbox (or DRT box) is a cell site simulator, a phone device mimicking a cell phone tower, that creates a signal strong enough to cause nearby dormant mobile phones to switch to it. Mounted on aircraft, it has been used by the United States Marshals Service since at least 2007 to locate and collect information from cell phones believed to be connected with criminal activity. It can also be used to jam phones. The device's name comes from the company that developed it, Digital Receiver Technology, Inc. (DRT), owned by the Boeing Company. Boeing describes the device as a hybrid of "jamming, managed access and detection". A similar device with a smaller range, the controversial StingRay phone tracker, has been widely used by U.S. federal entities, including the Federal Bureau of Investigation (FBI).

== History ==
It is not known when Digital Receiver Technology, Inc. (DRT) first manufactured the dirtbox. As of 2014, the company did not publicly advertise it, stating on its web site: "Due to the sensitive nature of our work, we are unable to publicly advertise many of our products." The Wall Street Journal wrote that the U.S. Marshals Service program utilizing the device had "fully matured by 2007". Boeing bought DRT in 2008.

Similar devices from the Harris Corporation, like the Stingray phone tracker, have been sold around the same time. Since 2008, their airborne mounting kit for cell phone surveillance has been said to cost $9,000.

On June 11, 2010, the Boeing Company asked the National Telecommunications and Information Administration to advise the United States Congress that the "... Communications Act of 1934 be modified to allow prison officials and state and local law enforcement to use appropriate cell phone management", and suggested that special weapons and tactics (SWAT) teams and other paramilitary tactical units could use their devices to control wireless communications during raids.

== Technology ==
The device is described as 2-square-foot (0.19 m^{2}) in size. To mimic a cell phone tower, it utilizes IMSI-catcher (International Mobile Subscriber Identity) technology, which phone services use to identify individual subscribers. It emits a pilot signal made to appear stronger than that from the nearest cell tower, causing phones within its range to broadcast their IMSI numbers and electronic serial numbers (ESN). Encryption does not prevent this process; the devices can retrieve a phone's encryption session keys in less than one second, with success rates of 50–75% under "real world conditions".

An aircraft-mounted device can locate a phone within 10 feet, Another source claims that by triangulating flights, a dirtbox can pinpoint a phone's location in as few as two feet.

The dirtbox is a hybrid of detection, managed access and jamming technologies. According to The Wall Street Journal, "people with knowledge of the program" can determine which phones belong to suspects and which to non-suspects, and that "cell phones not of interest, such as those belonging to prison personnel or commercial users in the area, are returned to their local network." It can also selectively interrupt or prevent calls on certain phones, and has been used to block unauthorized phone use by prison inmates. It can also retrieve data from phones. According to Boeing, its technology is "unobtrusive to legitimate wireless communications", and bypasses phone companies in its operations.

== Agency use ==
=== Law enforcement ===
As of November 2014, the U.S. Marshals Service Technical Operations Group has used the device, fixed on crewed airplanes, to track fugitives, and has said it can deploy it on "targets requested by other parts of the Justice Program". The devices are operated out of at least five U.S. airports, "covering most of the U.S. population". It is unclear whether the U.S. Marshals Service requests court orders to use the devices.

The Marshals Service has used dirtboxes in the Mexican drug war, tracking fugitives in coordination with Mexico's Naval Infantry Force and flights in Guatemala.

Dirtboxes are used by the United States Special Operations Command, the Drug Enforcement Administration, the FBI and U.S. Customs and Border Protection. According to procurement documents, the U.S. Navy bought dirtboxes to mount on drones at Naval Air Weapons Station China Lake, its research and development facility in Southern California. The Pentagon Washington Headquarters Services bought dirtboxes in 2011.

The Chicago Police Department bought dirtboxes to eavesdrop on demonstrators during the 2012 NATO summit, and used them during the 2014 Black Lives Matter demonstrations. In 2015, it became known that the Los Angeles Police Department had purchased the devices.

=== Signal intelligence ===
Based on references to "DRTBox" in NSA's Boundless informant screenshots leaked by Edward Snowden, dirtboxes are probably used by the NSA. In 2013, the French newspaper LeMonde wrote, "Thanks to DRTBOX, 62.5 million phone data were collected in France". The United States Naval Special Warfare Development Group's Group One bought a Digital Receiver Technology 1301B System on April 2, 2007 for over $25,000, according to the United States government procurement web site.

== U.S. regulation ==
The National Telecommunications and Information Administration (NTIA) has known of dirtboxes since at least 2010. In 2014, the United States Department of Justice refused to confirm or deny that government agencies used them, but an official said, "It would be utterly false to conflate the law-enforcement program with the collection of bulk telephone records by the National Security Agency". The Federal Communications Commission, responsible for licensing and regulating cell-service providers, was not aware of dirtbox activity prior to The Wall Street Journal exposé.

In January 2015, the US Senate Judiciary Committee asked the Department of Justice and Department of Homeland Security which law enforcement agencies used DRTboxes, and to specify the legal processes and policies that existed to protect the privacy of those whose information was collected.

== Criticism ==
In 2014, privacy advocates, including U.S. Rep. Alan Grayson (D-Florida), have criticized dirtbox use as a violation of the Fourth Amendment to the United States Constitution. Brian Owsley, a law professor at Indiana Institute of Technology and former United States magistrate, said in 2014 that to use the devices legally, "I think the government would need to obtain a search warrant based on probable cause consistent with the Fourth Amendment".

The Guardian quoted Michael German, a professor at New York University Law School and former FBI agent, as saying: "The overriding problem is the excessive secrecy that hides the government’s ever-expanding surveillance programs from public accountability."

In November 2014, Senator Edward Markey (D-Massachusetts) and former Senator Al Franken (D-Minnesota) have warned that Americans' privacy rights must be assured.

== See also ==
- Cellphone surveillance
- Signals intelligence
- Stingray phone tracker
