= Dirtbox =

Dirtbox may refer to:

- Dirtbox (cell phone), a cell site simulator that mimics a cell phone tower, used by security agencies to collect information about phones
- One of several aliases of Ewan Pearson, an English electronic music producer
