= Findmykids =

Child monitoring software

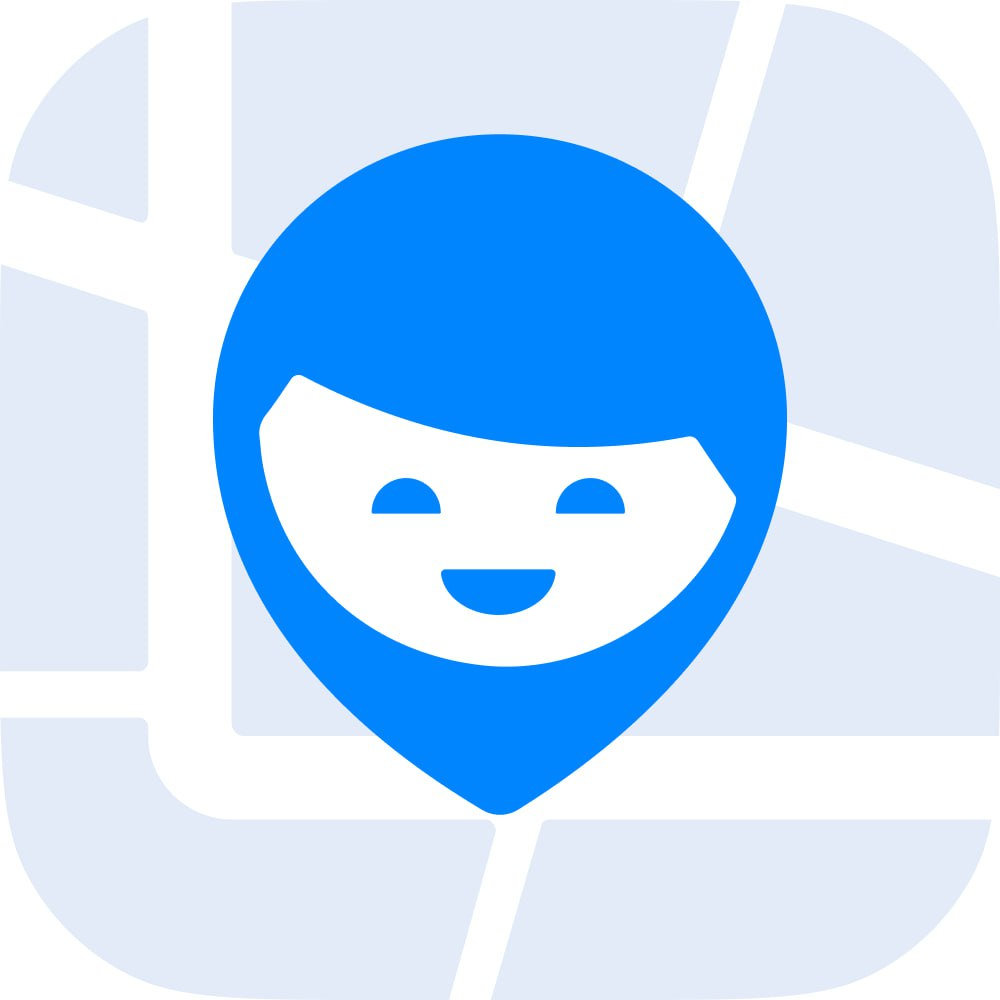
- Developer: LETEM LTD
- Release: Android (June 17, 2015); iOS (April 2015)
- Stable release: 2.8.80 Android; 2.2.333 iOS
- Written in: Kotlin, Java, Swift, Objective C, PHP, Go, Python
- Operating system: iOS 15 and later, Android 6 and later
- Platform: iOS and Android
- Available in: 55 languages
- Type: Location-based service
- License: Proprietary software
- Website: findmykids.org

Findmykids is an application for tracking geolocation and movements using a smartphone or a GPS-enabled watch. It is designed to monitor children's movements and supervise their safety.

== Overview ==
The application was developed by LETEM LTD, a company registered in Cyprus, and was released in 2016. The main purpose of the application is to provide parents with real-time information about the location of their children, as well as notifications related to their movements. The application includes features such as location tracking, geofencing, emergency alerts, and remote audio monitoring.

In 2019, Findmykids was nominated for the Best Mobile App of 2019 by the Best Mobile App Awards. In 2023, the application was integrated with Apple Watch devices. As of 2023, the app has been translated into 55 languages and, according to the developer, has reached around 4 million downloads.

== Help in finding children program ==
In August 2025 Findmykids launched "Help in finding children" program, converting its users into alert network for missing child cases. Developer created a team that monitors missing person reports in official sources nationwide. Parents can also report their missing child directly through the app. Once details are verified, the team publishes an alert on the app, which usually happens within minutes. The system then sends push notifications to other users. An alert typically includes the child’s photo and key identifying details. In addition, an interactive map on the platform also marks the site where a kid was seen for the last time.

== Features ==
- Location tracking — displays the current location of the child and the history of their movements;
- Geofencing — allows setting zones with notifications when the child enters or leaves them ("safe zones");
- Sound signal — the ability to remotely activate a loud sound on the child's device, even if the gadget is in silent mode;
- Battery monitoring — notifies parents when the battery level of the child's device is low;
- Remote audio listening — a feature that allows listening to the surrounding sound around the child's device;
- App usage statistics — provides information about which applications the child is using.

== Functioning principle ==
The application operates on a client-server architecture and includes two mobile components:

- Findmykids — the app installed on the parent's device. It is intended for receiving information about the child's location, notifications, and access to safety functions.
- Pingo by Findmykids — the app installed on the child's device. It collects location data using GPS, Wi-Fi, and mobile networks. The information is transmitted to the server, where it is processed to determine coordinates with an accuracy of approximately 20 to 100 meters.

If there is no internet connection, the app continues to collect data, temporarily storing it and synchronizing once the connection is restored. The use of the application requires the consent of the child and adheres to regulations such as the General Data Protection Regulation (GDPR) and the kidSAFE Seal Program.

== Privacy concerns ==
Some features of the application, particularly remote audio monitoring, have raised concerns among privacy experts. Such functionalities may be perceived as potential intrusions into personal privacy and could affect the level of trust between parents and children. In addition, studies have pointed out possible vulnerabilities in similar child-tracking apps, leading to concerns about data protection and the risk of unauthorized access.

== Security measures ==
In response to these concerns, the developer states that it has implemented several security measures:

- Data encryption: the application uses SSL encryption to protect data transmitted between devices and servers;
- Regulatory compliance: The app claims compliance with international data protection regulations, including the General Data Protection Regulation (GDPR) and the Children's Online Privacy Protection Act (COPPA);
- Parental consent requirements: Use of the application requires the explicit consent of both the parent and the child.

== Awards and nominations ==
Year	Recipient	Award	Category	Notes	Result	Ref.
2017	Findmykids	Google Play Awards	Best Android Apps (Innovation App)		Won	
2019	Findmykids	Best Mobile App Awards	Best Mobile App of 2019		Nominated	
