= Jam, Iran (disambiguation) =

Jam, Iran is a city in Bushehr Province, Iran.

Jam (Persian: جم) in Iran, may also refer to:

- Jam, Khuzestan
- Jam, Semnan
- Jam County, in Bushehr County
- Jam Rural District, in Bushehr County
