= Jams =

Jams or JAMS may refer to:

- Plural form of jam, a type of fruit preserve
- Jams (clothing line)
- JAMS (organization), United States organization that provides alternative dispute resolution services
- The JAMs, former name of The KLF, a British band
- The Jams, a waterfall along Cache Creek in Lake County, California
- Jams (album), 1995 album by Northeast Groovers

== Acronym ==
- Journal of African Media Studies
- Journal of the Academy of Marketing Science
- Journal of the American Mathematical Society
- Journal of the American Musicological Society
- JAMS (organization), an alternative dispute resolution service
- John Adams Middle School, one of the Edison Township Public Schools in Edison, New Jersey, US

== See also ==
- Jam (disambiguation)
