= CSLI =

CSLI may refer to:

- Center for the Study of Language and Information, a part of Stanford University
- Cell site location information, a component of mobile phone tracking
- CubeSat Launch Initiative
