= Pocket dialing =

Type of accidental phone call

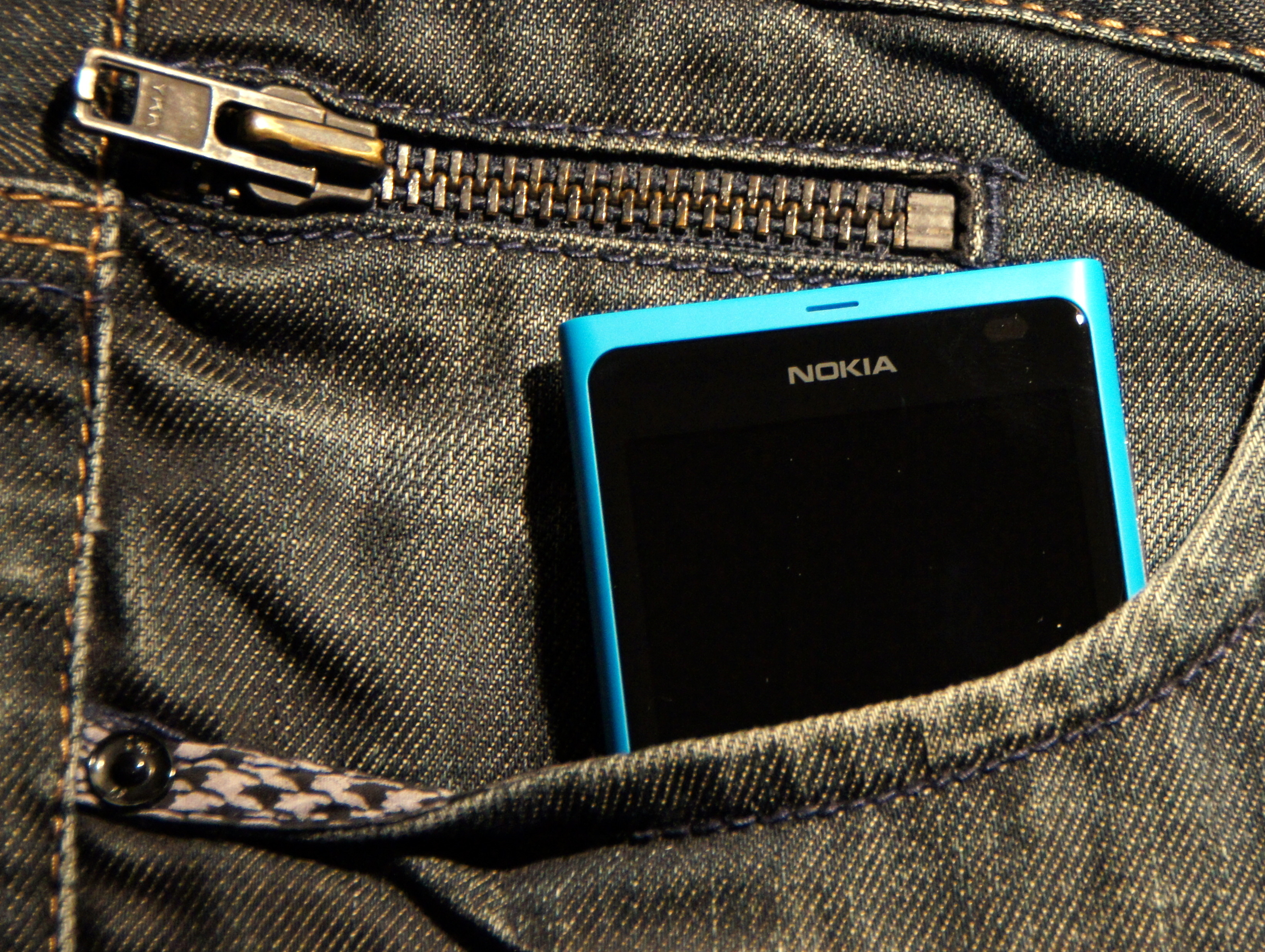
Mobile phone in a pocket

Pocket dialing (also known as pocket calling or butt dialing) is the accidental placement of a call on a mobile phone or cordless phone located in a person's pocket or handbag. The recipient of the call typically hears background noise when answering the phone. If the caller remains unaware, the recipient will sometimes overhear whatever is happening in the caller's vicinity. A pocket-dialed call can continue for many minutes, until the caller runs out of account balance or the recipient's voice mail system ends the call. The phrase "pocket dial" was added to the Oxford English Dictionary in August 2015.

== Causes ==
Modern cellphones come in three configurations: flip phones, where the phone is physically closed when not in use, rendering the keys inaccessible; touch phones, which require the use of a finger or stylus is to use the controls; and open phones, where keys or buttons are always exposed. Pocket dialing primarily occurs with touch phones and open phones.

Typically, a call is caused by the person's movement changing the shape of the pocket in a person's clothing in such a way that a small amount of pressure is applied to some of the buttons, or in the case of a touch screen phone, a call can also be caused by the screen of the phone facing the person's body and a small amount of perspiration creating sufficient conduction through their clothing for the capacitive touch screen to detect their clothing as if it were a touch from the user's finger.

The keypad lock feature found on most mobile phones is intended to help prevent accidental dialing, but is often so trivial that the keypad is easily pocket-unlocked. Sometimes the unlock sequence requires nothing more than pressing a button and then applying a random swiping motion to the screen, or in the case of some keypad phones, nothing more than holding a particular key for several seconds.

== Consequences ==
In addition to the inconvenience and embarrassment that may result from an erroneously dialed number, the phenomenon can have other consequences including using up a phone user's airtime minutes. Accidental calls, if not hung up immediately, tie up the recipient's phone line. If this is a landline, the recipient may have difficulty in disconnecting the call in order to use the phone, as networks sometimes define a timeout period between the recipient hanging up and the call actually being cleared.

Accidental calls are often cited as being one of the more annoying consequences of cell phone usage. Given the haphazard nature of inadvertent dialing, most actual misconnections do not result from the selection of random numbers. Instead, pocket dialing frequently triggers the "recently dialed" and "contact" lists that are contained within modern cell phones. The caller is frequently unaware that the call has taken place, whereas the recipient of the call often hears background conversation and background noises such as the rustling of clothes, sounds from vehicles and other similar ambient noises. Due to the dialing of common numbers, the recipient is likely to know the caller, and may overhear conversations that the caller would not want them to hear.

In 2013, an Arkansas man, who allegedly hatched an elaborate plan to murder a former employee, was arrested after he reportedly pocket dialed the victim and revealed the plot.

Investigator Joseph Morgan, a law enforcement officer with the Nevada Taxicab Authority which regulates the taxicabs in Clark County, Nevada is being prosecuted by the Nevada Attorney General's Office for leaking the contents of a pocket dial. Nevada Taxicab Authority Chief Investigator Ruben V. Aquino, Jr. pocket dialed Morgan. Aquino was then heard inappropriately discussing information relating to a confidential internal investigation. Aquino and another Investigator, Antoine "Chris" Rivers, then further discussed how the taxicab companies in Las Vegas control the day-to-day operations of the Nevada Taxicab Authority. Aquino also criticized Morgan for being proactive in his duty performance. Morgan, acting as a whistleblower, leaked the information to Nevada Governor Brian Sandoval, Nevada Attorney General Catherine Cortez-Masto, members of the Nevada Legislature and the media. Instead of investigating the Nevada Taxicab Authority for corruption, Morgan is being prosecuted for leaking this information. This might be the first and only occurrence of an individual being prosecuted for listening to or leaking the contents of a pocket dial.

=== Accidental calling of emergency services ===
Operators of emergency services telephone numbers, such as 911 and 999, report receiving many false alarms that are likely a result of pocket dialing. These nuisance calls can result in a drain on operators' time, particularly during summer months, which is possibly due to an increase in roller-coaster ridership. As many as 50% of emergency calls may be accidental calls. On many older phones in the United States, pushing and holding down the number "9" key will cause the phone to automatically dial 911. In many regions, the operators must spend time and resources to determine whether the call is real or accidental. The phone calls often sound similar to the sorts of struggles people have while being involved in an actual emergency.

In 2014, a 9-1-1 operator in Florida received an accidental call from a meth lab in Volusia County, leading to the arrest of the three occupants for manufacturing and possessing methamphetamine.

Many mobile phones will allow calling of the emergency number even when the keypad is locked, which poses a particular problem if the number is easy to dial accidentally (e.g. 999, 000). Accidental emergency calls are even more likely if the user has programmed the emergency number into the phone's contacts or speed dial.

To make matters worse, some phones make it easier to call the emergency services when the keypad is locked than it would be otherwise. An example of this is a soft key programmed to make an emergency call when the keylock is set. On touch-screen phones, passcode screens often include a single button that, when touched for just a few seconds, will dial emergency services. The result is that it is often preferable to disable the passcode since, while doing so increases the likelihood of pocket dialing family and friends, it is considered a lesser evil than pocket dialing the emergency services.

In the UK, calls to the emergency number 999 are generally assumed to be accidental if the caller does not speak and there are no suspicious sounds. However, occasionally such "silent" calls are genuine because the caller is unable or afraid to speak. Police advice is for the caller to then dial 55 to indicate to the operator that the call is genuine.

== Solutions ==
=== Hardware ===
==== Flip phone ====
A 2009 mobile phone advertising campaign by T-Mobile touted their phones' resistance to inadvertent pocket dialing as being an advantage of certain flip phone models available at the time—specifically the BlackBerry Pearl Flip.

==== Microphone blocker ====
A microphone blocker is useful to prevent a mobile phone against audio interception from pocket dialing.

=== Software ===
For Android phones, there exist apps that reduce the risk of pocket dialing.

Newer versions of Android retain the "Emergency call" facility on the lock screen; however, they require the user to key in the emergency telephone number in order to proceed with the call, thereby making an accidental emergency call less likely than in earlier Android versions.
