= Mobile positioning data =

Data from location of mobile phones

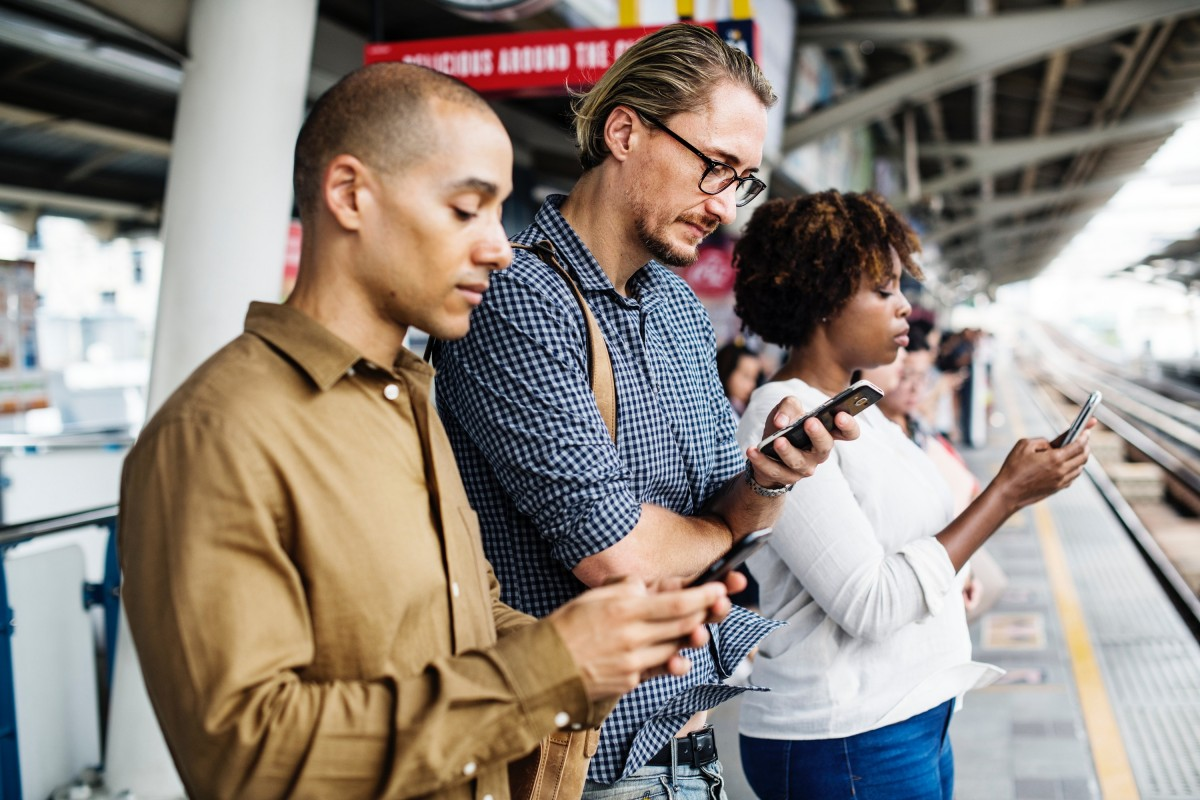
It has become an everyday habit for many people to carry a mobile phone with them.

Mobile positioning data (MPD) is a form of big data which results from the high data volumes of mobile positioning – tracking the location of mobile phones.

Mobile positioning data can be used for generating population and tourism statistics, for measuring human mobility, creating data-driven solutions in urban planning, establishing a response plan to disasters etc.

There are many ways to track the location of a mobile device in a network but this article covers mobile positioning data from network-based technologies:

- Active mobile positioning is based on mobile network operators where the location of the mobile phone is determined with a special query. Mobile phones are positioned based on network signals from the network antennae, and usually using the signal triangulation method. Collecting this data generally requires special permissions (consent from people being positioned), meaning that the number of people who are being positioned is usually small.
- Passive mobile positioning uses metadata from mobile phone use, such as incoming or outgoing calls or text messages (call detail records) or mobile internet usage (data detail records), that are automatically stored by every mobile network operator. The accuracy of passive mobile positioning is limited to the coverage area of network cells, which can range from a few hundred metres to multiple kilometres.

Compared to passive mobile positioning, active mobile positioning yields more accurate location data and provides a greater frequency in the data points created. Although less accurate, passive mobile positioning data has many benefits: it can be collected more easily compared to active mobile positioning data (requires no individual agreements), the number of people positioned can be much bigger and it can be gathered for longer periods of time.

== History ==
Identifying mobile device locations achieved greater precision at the beginning of the 2000s. An important part was played by the E911 law accepted in the USA which made it mandatory to determine the original location of emergency calls. As the technical solutions of identifying a mobile phone's location developed further, different location based-services started to emerge. This possibility of observing people's movements and also their social characteristics became a subject of great interest for researchers and it was first introduced as the Social Positioning Method (SPM) in 2004. The method was developed by the Department of Geography of the University of Tartu, with professor Rein Ahas at the head and the company Positium, who also carried out the first research employing that method. SPM-based research focused on social flows in time and space by analysing the location coordinates of mobile phones (and also the social identification of the people carrying them). Since that method used active mobile positioning, consent from the people observed was needed. Mobile positioning data emerged as a completely new source of information and analysis in geography and social sciences. The benefit of using this kind of data was that it enabled further describing the space-time movements of the society, meaning this information could be used for research, planning and the administration of public life.

== Attributes and types of mobile positioning data ==
A mobile positioning record is created in the database of a mobile network operator when a mobile device is communicating with the network. These records are considered passive mobile positioning data and when they are created, they are registered by different network entities. For example, when a mobile device initiates a location area update, a database (such as Visitor Location Register) stores the corresponding location area code. Every time a subscriber uses services like calling, messaging or mobile internet, different records are generated.

The main attributes that characterise mobile positioning data are the following:

- unique subscriber's identifier (randomly generated to anonymise the dataset)
- time attribute (date, hours, minutes and seconds)
- location (at the level of the cell tower that the mobile device was connected to). For domestic and inbound mobile positioning data, the geographical reference is the location and/or the coverage area of the network cell (initially the ID of the cell). For outbound mobile positioning data, the initial geographical reference is the country of the roaming partner MNO.

Passive mobile positioning data can be divided into three categories from the perspective of a mobile network operator:

- domestic mobile positioning data – any mobile positioning record created within the network of a mobile network operator (MNO) resulting from the mobile device use of a subscriber of a home MNO.
- outbound mobile positioning data – any mobile positioning record created in a roaming network of a foreign MNO resulting from the mobile device use of a subscriber of a home MNO.
- inbound mobile positioning data – any mobile positioning record created within the network of a mobile network operator resulting from the mobile device use of a roaming subscriber of a foreign MNO.

== Use cases ==
The digital footprint left by mobile device users is sensitive, but also highly valuable, as it provides new possibilities of measuring and monitoring the spatio-temporal activities of the population. This makes MPD a great data source for gathering statistics, as it can fill in the gaps where other data sources are lacking. Traditionally, people's location and mobility are studied via questionnaires, travel and time use surveys, censuses. This method, however, has many limitations. The sample of questionnaires is usually relatively small and although censuses cover the whole population and contain detailed information, they are not held frequently. Thus the data from questionnaires can be gathered only in some discrete moments in time. The collection of MPD, however, is continuous and can cover the majority of the population. Also, since passive mobile positioning data is collected continuously by mobile network operators, it offers the possibility of generating statistics on a very granular level. Furthermore, it allows producing near real-time statistics as well statistics on events that happened years ago.

A number of research papers and use cases shows that mobile positioning data plays a very important role in various domains such as tourism, health, socio-economics, disaster response, urban management, etc. Authors indicate a plethora of fields that could benefit from the use of mobile positioning, such as urban and transportation planning, traffic flow monitoring, event planning (concerts, sports, festivals), safety and security (risk analyses based on the number of people at a specific location at a specific time), transportation origin-destination matrices, tourism and place marketing, epidemiology (geographic spreading of infectious diseases), and monitoring of hotspots (gathering places for tourists and residents). Much of this research is conducted on the basis of identifying meaningful locations, such as home and work anchor points, with the help of passive mobile positioning data.

Some domain-specific examples of MPD use include the following:

- Tourism – MPD enables examining tourist flows and linking them with event attendance and location visits, helping many tourism associations to plan and manage their work and services more efficiently.
- Transportation – MPD can effectively be used for a data-driven approach to reorganising public transportation. For example, in Estonia, the city government of Tartu launched a bus route network which was designed by using mobile positioning data to understand user needs and travelling routes.
- Development – call detail records can be analysed with the aim of planning humanitarian development actions, such as emergency migration in Haiti, malaria mapping in Kenya, poverty level estimation in Côte d'Ivoire.
- Social good – MPD can be used to inform development and humanitarian work. Examples of such use cases include predicting dengue fever outbreaks more quickly in Pakistan, using rapid and near real-time assessment of population displacement following the Nepal earthquake.
- Modelling epidemics – since human mobility is the main component of large-scale spatial transmission of infectious diseases, it is critical to model and quantify human mobility in order to improve epidemic control. Examples: analysing Malaria transmission in Senegal, responding to Ebola outbreak, monitoring the spread of cholera outbreaks.
- Poverty and wealth – accurate and timely estimates of population characteristics are a critical input to social and economic research and policy. An example of a use case here is predicting wealth throughout Rwanda using mobile positioning data.
- Seasonal mobility – analysing human movement patterns and monitoring changes in them are important for decision-making. For example, in MPD-based research carried out in Senegal, the movement patterns of different population groups were extracted and visualised.

== Official statistics ==
Mobile positioning data can be used in the production of official statistics.

As at 2021, there are two countries in the world where statistics providers use passive mobile positioning data as part of the regular production of official tourism statistics: Estonia and Indonesia. Eesti Pank, the central bank of Estonia, produces official tourism travel statistics based on passive mobile positioning data since 2008 and the Indonesian Ministry of Tourism produces MPD-based inbound cross-border visitor arrival statistics since 2016.

== Advantages of mobile positioning data ==
For statistical purposes, mobile positioning data provides new possibilities in terms of the quality of the data. Statistics based on MPD can be compiled automatically, in some cases almost in real time, and it requires less manual labour. The job of analysing and interpreting the resulting statistical indicators is left for statisticians and researchers, but the new concept of fast and expansive data collection improves the quality of decision-making processes and results in public and private sectors.

Mobile positioning data is said to have better spatial and temporal precision than regular tourism statistics. The precision of antennae offers more perspectives of research than accommodation statistics does. Digital records on the movements of tourists make it possible to analyse their space-time behaviour. This allows the linking of routes used by tourists with the places they visited and the connecting of sites of interest with points of entry or with final destinations in the country etc. Space-time precision enables the investigation of single events and their geography more than had previously been possible. This allows studying the extent and impacts of events such as fairs, concerts, sports events and also managing crowds of visitors. Mobile positioning data is also touted to be suitable for studying tourism in less visited natural areas where it is difficult to use other methods such as accommodation statistics or questionnaires.

The timeliness of statistics (up to near real-time) and the possibility of producing unconfirmed quick indicators are further features provided by mobile positioning data. On the other hand, researchers might also face difficulty in assessing the quality of statistics based on MPD because the prevalence of mobile phone usage during travel is largely unknown and the methodology might not be firm. A relative lack of information on the purpose of the trip, expenditure, type of accommodation and means of transport used are also cited as common issues. Nevertheless, passive mobile positioning data has several advantages, which can substantiate its use and even open up new perspectives in tourism studies and management tools. One of the biggest advantages of positioning data is the possibility of monitoring tourism in real time. The data can be gathered regularly and visualised in a real-time environment.

== Disadvantages of mobile positioning data ==
Mobile positioning data has also some weaknesses, such as the fact that even this data will not represent the total population since there are also people without mobile phones (young children, the elderly, certain socio-economic groups). In addition, the usage habits of mobile phone users can be very different, which, in the end, influences the resulting dataset. Furthermore, when using passive mobile positioning data, there is no information regarding the background of the users: their characteristics, socio-economic indicators, purpose of the trip, type of accommodation and means of transport used etc. More detailed information on these characteristics can be gathered with additional questionnaires in the case of active mobile positioning data, the collection of which generally requires special permissions (consent from people being positioned) anyway. However, the obligation of asking for permission means that the sample of actively positioned people is usually small.

The spatial accuracy of passive mobile positioning depends on the geographical division of the mobile network, which is not equally distributed in space. This means that passive mobile positioning is spatially more precise in densely populated urban areas and near highways due to a larger number of cell towers, but in the countryside, for example, the accuracy is lower. Moreover, the accuracy of passive mobile positioning is limited to the coverage area of network cells, which can range from a few hundred metres to multiple kilometres.

== Privacy concerns ==
Mobile positioning technology in general might create fears that people's locations and activities are being monitored from away. Many of the concerns related to positioning data are in the privacy and surveillance fields and those issues need to be addressed and discussed very carefully. In the field of MPD, many different measures are in place to safeguard users' privacy, such as data pseduonymisation/anonymisation, whereby a subscriber's personal identity code can be modified or data can be aggregated to give anonymity to the subjects. Alongside that, sampling (decreasing the possibility for a person to be included in a dataset) and obfuscation (masking or hiding original data) could be used as alternatives or employed for further increasing the level of privacy protection.
