= Microphone blocker =

Technology to disable microphones

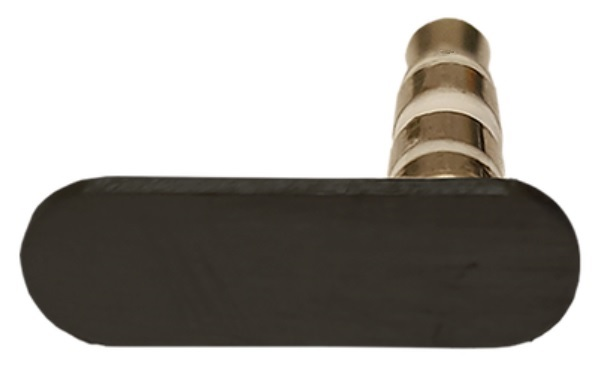
A microphone blocking plug

A microphone blocker is an adapter designed to prevent eavesdropping.

There are two types: active blockers, which conduct an electrical signal, and inactive ones which do not. Some active microphone blockers have no additional functions, whilst other adapters also allow audio output and power input (allowing simultaneous charging and protection against juice jacking). In addition to blockers that can be plugged into devices, there are also tray-style active blockers that mobile phones can be placed inside of.

== Operation ==
Microphone blockers are designed to disable a device's internal microphone by tricking the device into believing an external microphone is connected. A 3.5 mm microphone blocker with just a TS connection is enough to disconnect the internal microphone, but most commercial microphone blockers have TRRS connections which makes them act as headset blockers. In theory, a headset blocker used with a smartphone will also disconnect the device's internal speaker, because the device will believe there are headphones connected, while ringtones and alarms will function as normal because they use both the internal and external speakers.

Successful operation of a microphone blocker depends on the internal scheme of the mobile device, which may fully block the microphone without possibility of recovering data, or just disregard the signal from internal microphone with the possibility of recording if needed.

== Types ==
=== Microphone blocking plug ===
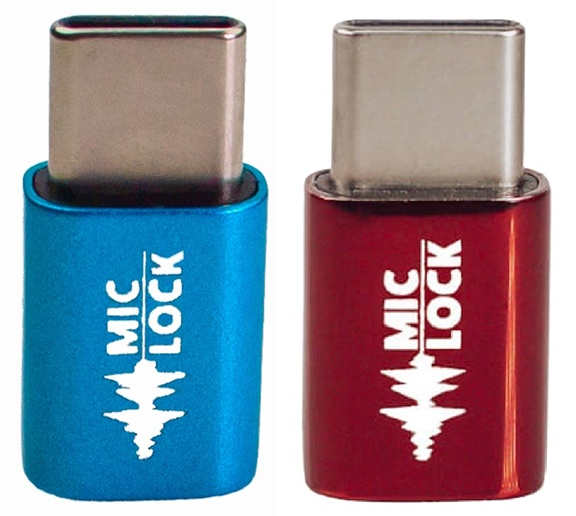
Two microphone blocking plugs with USB C interfaces

A microphone blocking plug connects into a phone connector providing a microphone emulator so that the phones microphone is disabled. Products available include those with: USB-C, Thunderbolt and 3.5mm TTRS male plugs and female connectors (with a keychain hole, or a small strap attached directly to smartphone cases) to prevent loss when the male connector is detached. A mobile phone charm (especially with TRS connector instead of a rubber plug) can be used to conceal a dummy blocker.

A microphone blocking plug can be used to debug software-defined radio that demands a connector to be plugged but they cannot be used to stream radio due to its low antenna efficiency.

Common products that can be used as microphone blockers:

- A soldering jack plug (TR, TRS, or TRRS), with metal or plastic base - A slim plug with right angle is recommended to fit the jack plug hole in smartphone cases and to not cause frictions in the socket.
- A TRRS male-male jack plug cable - Another cheap solution that provides two microphone blocking plugs, the cost per plug is usually cheaper than commercial microphone blocking plugs. The cable can either be cut to provide two separate plugs or be left intact to allow plugging into two mobile phones.
- A headphone cable with microphone, a wired headset, or a wired microphone - More expensive and will provide just one blocking plug.

It is possible that microphone connectors without a microphone circuit like the above solutions offer low security, because without a microphone circuit, software has the ability to override the default behavior.

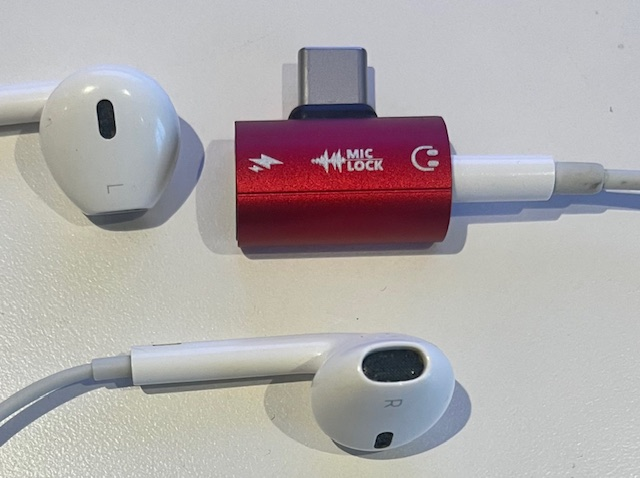
Mic-Lock USB-C Microphone blocking adaptor with mobile telephone earphones

=== Microphone blocking adapter ===
Headsets with an integrated microphone blocker also exist, allowing users to use the headphones (ie. for listening to music) without risking being eavesdropped. Microphone blocking adapters are phone connector adapters with a microphone channel and a mechanism that produces a false positive signal simulating a connected microphone. This mechanism cannot be built by pairing multiple connectors; a headset connected to a 3.5 mm TRRS headset extension cable adapter further connected to a 3.5 TRS headphone cable adapter does not trick the connected mobile phone to disconnect its external microphone.

=== Microphone blocking tray ===
This design is a tray that mobile phones can be placed onto that uses ultrasonic waves to interfere with their microphones.

== Why users consider Microphone blockers ==
=== Eavesdropping protection for feature phones ===
A microphone blocker is a cheap, simple accessory that provides countersurveillance against eavesdropping, e.g. recording external conversations, from interception (like cellphone surveillance) and phone hacking. There are also a variety of computing vulnerabilities like proprietary software and firmware, backdoors, hardware security bugs, hardware backdoors, hardware Trojans, and spyware and malware programs. Increasingly, applications turn on a mobile device's microphone remotely or as part of the application's functionality. The vast majority of devices do not have internal hardware protection to prevent eavesdropping. Most antivirus and anti-spying software does not guarantee that the microphone will be fully blocked or disabled, and can even be prevented doing so by constantly evolving spyware and malware.

=== Evidence for users' concerns ===
A new acoustic cryptanalysis technique, discovered by a research team at Israel's Ben-Gurion University Cybersecurity Research Center, allows data to be extracted using a computer's speakers and headphones. Forbes published a report stating that researchers found a way to see information being displayed, with 96.5% accuracy, by using only a device's microphone.

Where an ASP's use of a device has technically been legally authorized by its user (e.g., through a "click-through" license), ASP's are increasingly using mobile telephone's sensors, for purposes of which the user is not necessarily aware. For example, companies such as Facebook and Google can track a user's Internet search behavior across multiple devices.

Leaked documents codenamed Vault 7 and dated from 2013 to 2016, described the capabilities of the United States Central Intelligence Agency (CIA) to perform electronic surveillance and cyber warfare, including the ability to compromise the operating systems of most smartphones, turning them into permanent listening devices. Millions of smartphones could also be vulnerable to software cracking via accelerometers.

=== Pocket dialing protection ===
A microphone blocker is useful to prevent a mobile phone against audio interception from pocket dialing.

=== Working alternatives for modern hardware devices ===
- Hardware kill switch (HKS): Some hardware devices can physically disconnect and/or cut power to integrated components with security switches.
- Hacking of consumer electronics: Whistleblower Edward Snowden showed Vice owner Shane Smith how to remove the cameras and microphones from a smartphone. The only practical ways are to physically remove all the internal microphones (can be more than one, like a noise cancellation mic) and only plug headsets and use the headset microphone to record when needed.
- Modular hardware: Cameras and microphones can be physically removed from modular hardware.

== Problems ==
=== Smartphone incompatibility ===
Microphone blockers, including commercial microphone blockers with an integrated circuit marketed to provide "extra security", are not effective for smartphones, which are controlled entirely by software. This can be demonstrated by connecting a microphone blocker to a smartphone and making a phone call using speaker mode, which will also activate the internal microphone.

However, although they would work, there are further problems:

- Since Apple started to exclude the headphone jack in 2016 from iPhone 7, iPhone 7 Plus and later versions, more and more phone companies are eliminating it. TRRS 3.5 mm positive microphone blocker adapters with connectors to Lightning cables exist, and cables with USB-C connectors can be produced. Apple has filed dozens of wireless patents, and there are rumors that they are planning to produce products without Lightning ports in the future to make them completely wireless. Bluetooth vendors advise customers with vulnerable Bluetooth devices to either turn them off in areas regarded as unsafe or set them to undiscoverable. Portable Bluetooth adapters for wired headsets, can be used as a workaround to connect the microphone blocker to wireless hardware devices with Bluetooth connectivity, however while making them susceptible to bluesnarfing.
- Some hardware devices (e.g. some Google Nexus smartphones) have, in addition to the internal recording microphone, an internal noise-cancellation microphone that may be on all the time, or that may be on in a way that is independent from what is plugged into the audio jack connector.

=== Feature phone compatibility ===
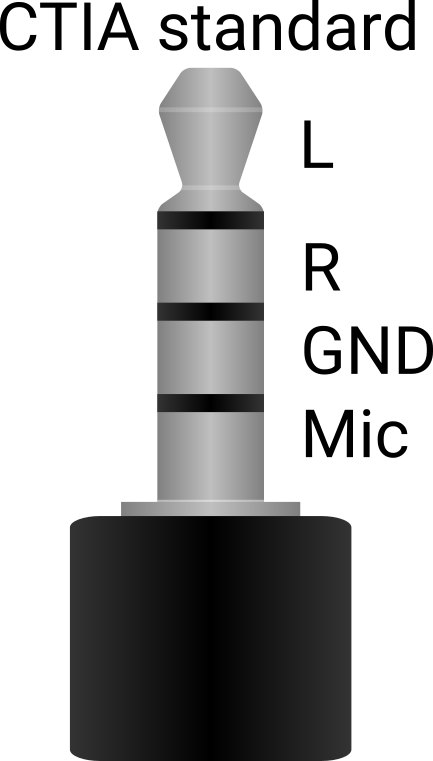
3.5mm TRRS phone connector with CTIA standard

A phone connector without a microphone channel cannot be used as a microphone blocker because it will not deactivate the external microphone. Three- or four-conductor (TRS or TRRS) 2.5 mm and 3.5 mm sockets are common on older cell phones and newer smartphones respectively, providing mono (three conductor) or stereo (four conductor) sound and a microphone input, together with signaling (e.g., push a button to answer a call).

=== Older hardware devices ===
CTIA/AHJ is the de facto TRRS standard. OMTP was mostly used on older hardware devices. However, the old mobile phones have a 2.5 mm jack connectors socket and cannot be used with modern microphone blockers that are typically 3.5 mm, but old mobile phones are notorious for their low security of the hardware itself. If a CTIA headset is connected to a mobile phone with OMTP interface, the external microphone will stay active. There, internal microphone will only be active when holding the microphone key on the headset. A standard TCIA/AHJ TRRS microphone blocker cannot be used with OMTP socket hardware devices and it is recommended to test all microphone blockers to make sure they really work.

== Abuse ==
=== Social engineering ===
A person can wiretap conversations from persons they, with social engineering, have deceived into believing that microphone blockers are safe to use with smartphones. This can, in theory, be exploited by companies that manufacture and sell commercial microphone blockers if they require a mobile phone number when people order their products or ask for support.

== See also ==
- Faraday cage
- Mobile phone jammer
- Mobile phone accessory
- Mobile security
- Secure voice
