= Triggerfish (surveillance) =

Cell phone interception technology

Triggerfish describes a technology of cell phone interception and surveillance using a mobile cellular base station (microcell or picocell). The devices are also known as cell-site simulators or digital analyzers.

== Device capability ==
- Tracking of a cell phone by a mobile FBI van (Wireless Intercept and Tracking Team) that seeks to locate a cell phone lacking GPS tracking by scanning for its emissions. This first became known for its use in tracking hacker Kevin Mitnick.
- Intercepting a cell phone call by a man-in-the-middle attack, if the option is enabled, and the user makes or receives a call.

== Controversy and concerns ==
Neither the user nor the cell phone provider need to know about Triggerfish for it to be used successfully. A court order is required, but the device circumvents provisions of CALEA barring use of pen register or trap-and-trace devices.

The device is similar to but distinct from an IMSI catcher.

On March 28, 2013, the Washington Post reported that federal investigators "routinely" use the systems to track criminal suspects, but sometimes fail to explain the technology sufficiently to magistrate judges from whom they seek search warrants.

== See also ==
- DCSNet
- Dirtbox (cell phone)
- Harris Corporation
- Stingray phone tracker
