= Jammin' (Andrews Sisters song) =

"Jammin'" is a 1937 hit song by the Andrews Sisters (Brunswick 7863). The song established the Andrews Sisters' popularity with their first record. The song was recorded in New York with Leon Belasco and his orchestra on March 18, 1937, in the same session that also recorded their other Brunswick Records release, "Wake Up and Live" (Brunswick 7872). By October 1937 the sisters had signed with Decca Records.
