= Jam Dam =

- Location within Maharashtra
- Official name: Jam Dam D03081
- Location: Katol
- Coordinates: 21.2177452°N 78.645308°E
- Opening date: 1996
- Owners: Government of Maharashtra, India

Dam and spillways
- Type of dam: Earthfill
- Impounds: Jam river
- Height: 24 m (79 ft)
- Length: 3,460 m (11,350 ft)
- Dam volume: 107 km^{3} (26 cu mi)

Reservoir
- Total capacity: 23,550 km^{3} (5,650 cu mi)
- Surface area: 7,565 km^{2} (2,921 sq mi)

Jam Dam, is an earthfill dam on Jam river near Katol, Nagpur district in state of Maharashtra in India.

== Specifications ==
The height of the dam above lowest foundation is 24 m (79 ft) while the length is 3,460 m (11,350 ft). The volume content is 107 km^{3} (26 cu mi) and gross storage capacity is 28,050.00 km^{3} (6,729.55 cu mi).

== Purpose ==
- Irrigation

== See also ==
- Dams in Maharashtra
- List of reservoirs and dams in India
