= Journal of African Media Studies =

- Discipline: African studies, media and communication studies
- Language: English
- Edited by: Winston Mano

Publication details
- History: 2009-present
- Publisher: Intellect
- Frequency: Triannual
- Open access: Hybrid
- Impact factor: 0.641 (2021)

Standard abbreviations
- ISO 4: J. Afr. Media Stud.

Indexing
- ISSN: 2040-199X (print); 1751-7974 (web)
- LCCN: 2010229530
- OCLC no.: 401237042

Links
- Journal homepage; Online archive

The Journal of African Media Studies is a triannual peer-reviewed academic journal covering historical and contemporary aspects of media and communication in Africa. It was established in 2009 and is published by Intellect. The founder and editor-in-chief is Winston Mano (University of Westminster).

== Abstracting and indexing ==
The journal is abstracted and indexed in:

- Arts and Humanities Citation Index
- Current Contents/Arts & Humanities
- Current Contents/Social and Behavioral Sciences
- EBSCO databases
- International Bibliography of Periodical Literature
- Modern Language Association Database
- ProQuest databases
- Scopus
- Social Sciences Citation Index

According to the Journal Citation Reports, the journal has a 2021 impact factor of 0.641.
