= Jamb (disambiguation) =

In architecture, a jamb is the side-post of a doorway or other aperture.

Jamb or JAMB may also refer to:

== Places in India ==
- Jamb, Nanded, Aurangabad division, central Maharashtra
- Jamb, Wardha, Nagpur division, eastern Maharashtra

== Other uses ==
- Jellia Jamb, a character in L. Frank Baum's Land of Oz
- Joint Admissions and Matriculation Board, a Nigerian university exam body
