= IMSI-catcher =

Telephone eavesdropping device

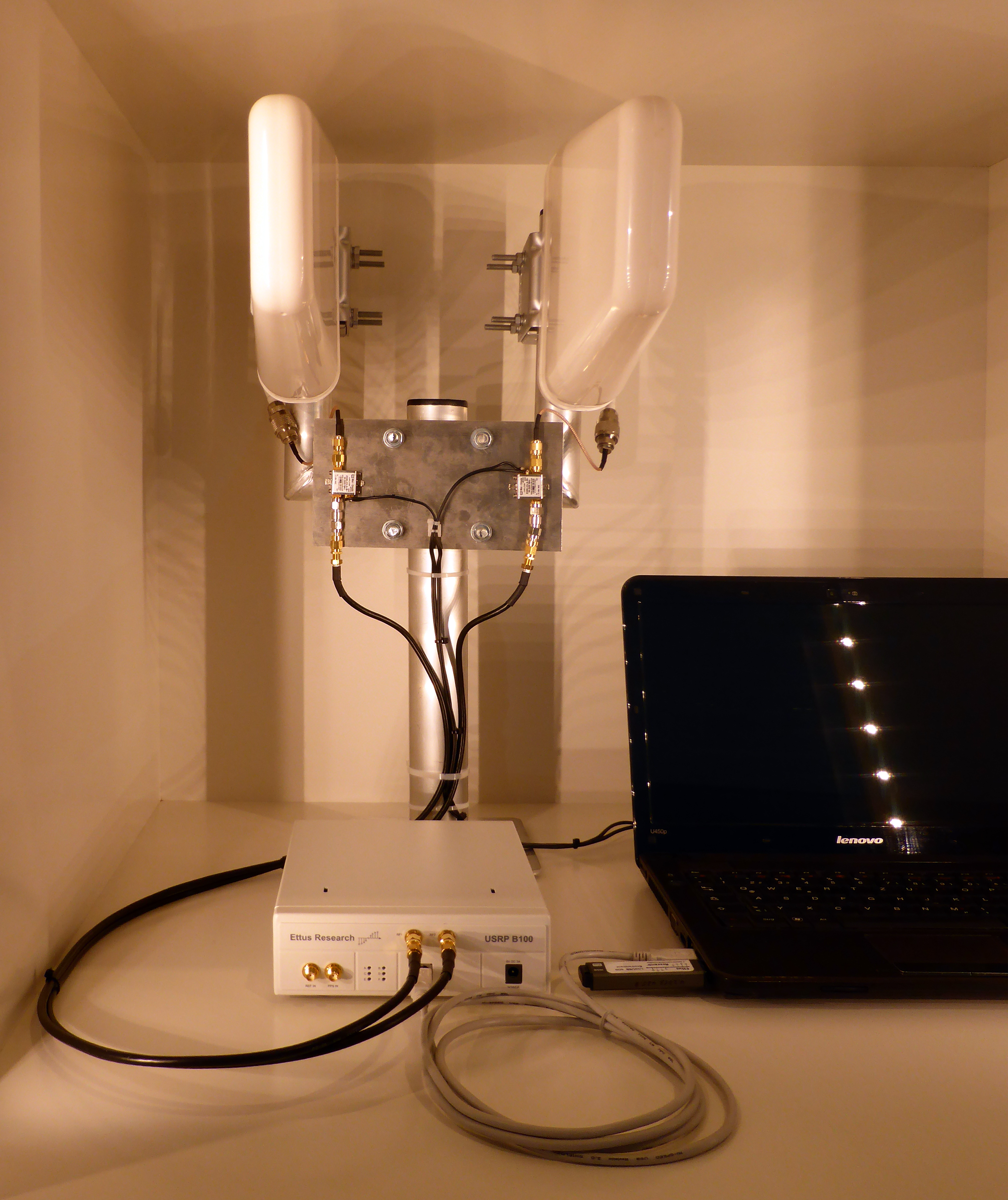
IMSI catcher on display at the German Museum of Technology in Berlin

An international mobile subscriber identity (IMSI) catcher or cell-site simulator (CSS) is a telephone eavesdropping device used for intercepting mobile phone traffic and tracking location data of mobile phone users. Essentially a "fake" mobile tower acting between the target mobile phone and the service provider's real towers, it is considered a man-in-the-middle (MITM) attack. The 3G wireless standard offers some risk mitigation due to mutual authentication required from both the handset and the network. However, sophisticated attacks may be able to downgrade 3G and LTE to non-LTE network services which do not require mutual authentication.

IMSI-catchers are used in a number of countries by law enforcement and intelligence agencies, but their use has raised significant civil liberty and privacy concerns and is strictly regulated in some countries such as under the German Strafprozessordnung (StPO / Code of Criminal Procedure). Some countries do not have encrypted phone data traffic (or very weak encryption), thus rendering an IMSI-catcher unnecessary.

== Overview ==
A virtual base transceiver station (VBTS) is a device for identifying the temporary mobile subscriber identity (TMSI), international mobile subscriber identity (IMSI) of a nearby GSM mobile phone and intercepting its calls, some are even advanced enough to detect the international mobile equipment identity (IMEI). It was patented and first commercialized by Rohde & Schwarz in 2003. The device can be viewed as simply a modified cell tower with a malicious operator, and on 4 January 2012, the Court of Appeal of England and Wales held that the patent is invalid for obviousness.

IMSI-catchers are often deployed by court order without a search warrant, the lower judicial standard of a pen register and trap-and-trace order being preferred by law enforcement. They can also be used in search and rescue operation for missing persons. Police departments have been reluctant to reveal use of these programs and contracts with vendors such as Harris Corporation, the maker of Stingray and Kingfish phone tracker devices.

In the UK, the first public body to admit using IMSI catchers was the Scottish Prison Service, though it is likely that the Metropolitan Police Service has been using IMSI catchers since 2011 or before.

Body-worn IMSI-catchers that target nearby mobile phones have been advertised to law enforcement agencies in the US since at least 2013.

The GSM specification requires the handset to authenticate to the network, but does not require the network to authenticate to the handset. This well-known security hole is exploited by an IMSI catcher. The IMSI catcher masquerades as a base station and logs the IMSI numbers of all the mobile stations in the area, as they attempt to attach to the IMSI-catcher. It allows forcing the mobile phone connected to it to use no call encryption (A5/0 mode) or to use easily breakable encryption (A5/1 or A5/2 mode), making the call data easy to intercept and convert to audio.

The 3G wireless standard mitigates risk and enhanced security of the protocol due to mutual authentication required from both the handset and the network and removes the false base station attack in GSM. Some sophisticated attacks against 3G and LTE may be able to downgrade to non-LTE network services which then does not require mutual authentication.

== Functionalities ==
=== Identifying an IMSI ===
Every mobile phone has the requirement to optimize its reception. If there is more than one base station of the subscribed network operator accessible, it will always choose the one with the strongest signal. An IMSI-catcher masquerades as a base station and causes every mobile phone of the simulated network operator within a defined radius to log in. With the help of a special identity request, it is able to force the transmission of the IMSI.

=== Tapping a mobile phone ===
The IMSI-catcher subjects the phones in its vicinity to a man-in-the-middle attack, appearing to them as a preferred base station in terms of signal strength. With the help of a SIM, it simultaneously logs into the GSM network as a mobile station. Since the encryption mode is chosen by the base station, the IMSI-catcher can induce the mobile station to use no encryption at all. Hence it can encrypt the plain text traffic from the mobile station and pass it to the base station.

A targeted mobile phone is sent signals where the user will not be able to tell apart the device from authentic cell service provider infrastructure. This means that the device will be able to retrieve data that a normal cell tower receives from mobile phones if registered.

There is only an indirect connection from mobile station via IMSI-catcher to the GSM network. For this reason, incoming phone calls cannot generally be patched through to the mobile station by the GSM network, although more modern versions of these devices have their own mobile patch-through solutions in order to provide this functionality.

=== Passive IMSI detection ===
The difference between a passive IMSI-catcher and an active IMSI-catcher is that an active IMSI-catcher intercepts the data in transfer such as spoken, text, mail, and web traffic between the endpoint and cell tower.

Active IMSI-catchers generally also intercept all conversations and data traffic within a large range and are therefore also called rogue cell towers. It sends a signal with a plethora of commands to the endpoints, which respond by establishing a connection and routes all conversations and data traffic between the endpoints and the actual cell tower for as long as the attacker wishes.

A passive IMSI-catcher on the other hand only detects the IMSI, TMSI or IMEI of an endpoint. Once the IMSI, TMSI or IMEI address is detected, the endpoint is immediately released. The passive IMSI-catcher sends out a signal with only one specific command to the endpoints, which respond to it and share the identifiers of the endpoint with the passive IMSI-catcher. The vendors of passive IMSI-catchers take privacy more into account.

== Universal Mobile Telecommunications System (UMTS) ==
False base station attacks are prevented by a combination of key freshness and integrity protection of signaling data, not by authenticating the serving network.

To provide a high network coverage, the UMTS standard allows for inter-operation with GSM. Therefore, not only UMTS but also GSM base stations are connected to the UMTS service network. This fallback is a security disadvantage and allows a new possibility of a man-in-the-middle attack.

== Tell-tales and difficulties ==
The assignment of an IMSI catcher has a number of difficulties:

1. It must be ensured that the mobile phone of the observed person is in standby mode and the correct network operator is found out. Otherwise, for the mobile station, there is no need to log into the simulated base station.
2. Depending on the signal strength of the IMSI-catcher, numerous IMSIs can be located. The problem is to find out the right one.
3. All mobile phones in the area covered by the catcher have no access to the network. Incoming and outgoing calls cannot be patched through for these subscribers. Only the observed person has an indirect connection.
4. There are some disclosing factors. In most cases, the operation cannot be recognized immediately by the subscriber. But there are a few mobile phones that show a small symbol on the display, e.g. an exclamation point, if encryption is not used. This "Ciphering Indication Feature" can be suppressed by the network provider, however, by setting the OFM bit in EF_{AD} on the SIM card. Since the network access is handled with the SIM/USIM of the IMSI-catcher, the receiver cannot see the number of the calling party. Of course, this also implies that the tapped calls are not listed in the itemized bill.
5. The assignment near the base station can be difficult, due to the high signal level of the original base station.
6. As most mobile phones prefer the faster modes of communication such as 4G or 3G, downgrading to 2G can require blocking frequency ranges for 4G and 3G.

== Detection and counter-measures ==
Some preliminary research has been done in trying to detect and frustrate IMSI-catchers. One such project is through the Osmocom open source mobile station software. This is a special type of mobile phone firmware that can be used to detect and fingerprint certain network characteristics of IMSI-catchers, and warn the user that there is such a device operating in their area. But this firmware/software-based detection is strongly limited to a select few, outdated GSM mobile phones (i.e. Motorola) that are no longer available on the open market. The main problem is the closed-source nature of the major mobile phone producers.

The application Android IMSI-Catcher Detector (AIMSICD) is being developed to detect and circumvent IMSI-catchers by StingRay and silent SMS. Technology for a stationary network of IMSI-catcher detectors has also been developed. Several apps listed on the Google Play Store as IMSI catcher detector apps include SnoopSnitch, Cell Spy Catcher, and GSM Spy Finder and have between 100,000 and 500,000 app downloads each. However, these apps have limitations in that they do not have access to phone's underlying hardware and may offer only minimal protection.

End-to-end encryption also protects communications even if they are intercepted.

== See also ==
- Telephone tapping
- Stingray phone tracker
- Mobile phone jammer
