= Radio jamming =

Interference with authorized wireless communications

Radio jamming is the deliberate blocking of or interference with wireless communications. In some cases, jammers work by the transmission of radio signals that disrupt telecommunications by decreasing the signal-to-noise ratio.

The concept can be used in wireless data networks to disrupt information flow. It is a common form of censorship in totalitarian states, in order to prevent foreign radio stations in border areas from reaching the country.

Vietnamese siren jammer trying to jam Radio Dap Loi Song Nui, an anti-government and anti-communist radio station

Vietnamese siren jammer trying to jam 9670 kHz

Jamming is usually distinguished from interference that can occur due to device malfunctions or other accidental circumstances. Devices that simply cause interference are regulated differently. Unintentional "jamming" occurs when an operator transmits on a busy frequency without first checking whether it is in use, or without being able to hear stations using the frequency. Another form of unintentional jamming occurs when equipment accidentally radiates a signal, such as a cable television plant that accidentally emits on an aircraft emergency frequency.

== Distinction between "jamming" and "interference" ==
Originally the terms were used interchangeably but nowadays most radio users use the term "jamming" to describe the deliberate use of radio noise or signals in an attempt to disrupt communications (or prevent listening to broadcasts) whereas the term "interference" is used to describe unintentional forms of disruption (which are far more common). However, the distinction is still not universally applied. For inadvertent disruptions, see electromagnetic compatibility.

== Method ==
Intentional communications jamming is usually aimed at radio signals to disrupt control of a battle. A transmitter, tuned to the same frequency as the opponents' receiving equipment and with the same type of modulation, can, with enough power, override any signal at the receiver. Digital wireless jamming for signals such as Bluetooth and WiFi is possible with very low power.

The most common types of this form of signal jamming are random noise, random pulse, stepped tones, warbler, random keyed modulated CW, tone, rotary, pulse, spark, recorded sounds, gulls, and sweep-through. These can be divided into two groups: obvious and subtle.

Obvious jamming is easy to detect because it can be heard on the receiving equipment. It is usually some type of noise, such as stepped tones (bagpipes), random-keyed code, pulses, music (often distorted), erratically warbling tones, highly distorted speech, random noise (hiss), and recorded sounds. Various combinations of these methods may be used, often accompanied by regular Morse identification signals to enable individual transmitters to be identified in order to assess their effectiveness. For example, China, which did and does use jamming extensively, plays a loop of traditional Chinese music while it is jamming channels (cf. Attempted jamming of numbers stations).

The purpose of this type of jamming is to block reception of transmitted signals and to cause a nuisance to the receiving operator. One early Soviet attempt at jamming Western broadcasters used the noise from the diesel generator that was powering the jamming transmitter.

Subtle jamming is jamming during which no sound is heard on the receiving equipment. The radio does not receive incoming signals; yet everything seems superficially normal to the operator. These are often technical attacks on modern equipment, such as "squelch capture". Thanks to the FM capture effect, frequency modulated broadcasts may be jammed, unnoticed, by a simple unmodulated carrier. The receiver locks on to the larger carrier signal, and hence will ignore the FM signal that carries the information.

Digital signals use complex modulation techniques, such as QPSK. These signals are very robust in the presence of interfering signals. But the signal relies on hand shaking between the transmitter and receiver to identify and determine security settings and method of high-level transmission. If the jamming device sends initiation data packets, the receiver will begin its state machine to establish two-way data transmission. A jammer will loop back to the beginning instead of completing the handshake. This method jams the receiver in an infinite loop where it keeps trying to initiate a connection but never completes it, which effectively blocks all legitimate communication.

Bluetooth and other consumer radio protocols such as WiFi have built-in detectors, so that they transmit only when the channel is free. Simple continuous transmission on a given channel will continuously stop a transmitter transmitting, hence jamming the receiver from ever hearing from its intended transmitter. Other jammers work by analysing the packet headers and, depending on the source or destination, selectively transmitting over the end of the message, corrupting the packet.

=== Types of jammers ===
- Portable jammers are phone-sized and low-powered devices. They can block data delivery at a distance up to 15 meters without barriers.
- Stationary jammers are more expensive and powerful. They usually have a larger jamming radius and wider frequency band. Strong jammers can require additional cooling as they can overheat. Stationary jammers usually have a range of 100 meters and require a power supply of 230 V.
- Self-made jammers are low-power devices that work over short ranges. However, the coverage can be extended using broadband amplifiers.

== History ==
During World War II, ground radio operators would attempt to mislead pilots by false instructions in their own language, in what was more precisely a spoofing attack than jamming. Radar jamming is also important to disrupt use of radar used to guide an enemy's missiles or aircraft. Modern secure communication techniques use such methods as spread spectrum modulation to resist the deleterious effects of jamming.

Jamming of foreign radio broadcast stations has often been used in wartime (and during periods of tense international relations) to prevent or deter citizens from listening to broadcasts from enemy countries. However, such jamming is usually of limited effectiveness because the affected stations usually change frequencies, put on additional frequencies and/or increase transmission power.

Jamming has also occasionally been used by the governments of Germany (during World War II), Israel, Cuba, Iraq, Iran (during the Iran-Iraq War), China, North and South Korea and several Latin American countries, as well as by Ireland against pirate radio stations such as Radio Nova. The United Kingdom government used two coordinated, separately located transmitters to jam the offshore radio ship, Radio North Sea International off the coast of Britain in 1970, to enforce its domestic broadcast licensing law.

=== World War II ===
In occupied Europe the Nazis attempted to jam broadcasts to the continent from the BBC and other allied stations. Along with increasing transmitter power and adding extra frequencies, attempts were made to counteract the jamming by dropping leaflets over cities instructing listeners to construct a directional loop aerial that would enable them to hear the stations through the jamming. In the Netherlands such aerials were nicknamed moffenzeef (lit. "kraut sieve").

During the Continuation War, after discovering the fact that the mines that the retreating Soviet forces had scattered throughout the city of Viipuri were radio-triggered rather than timer- or pressure-triggered, the Finnish forces played Vesterinen's recording of Säkkijärven Polkka without any pauses from September 4, 1941, to February 2, 1942, as they, to demine the city, needed to block the Soviets from activating the mines through the correct radio wave. The Soviets tried to trigger the mines by changing frequency; the mines had been set up to be able to be triggered by three different frequencies. The Finns countered this by playing Säkkijärven Polkka on all frequencies. During the Battle of the Beams, Britain jammed navigation signals used by German aircraft.

=== Cold War era ===
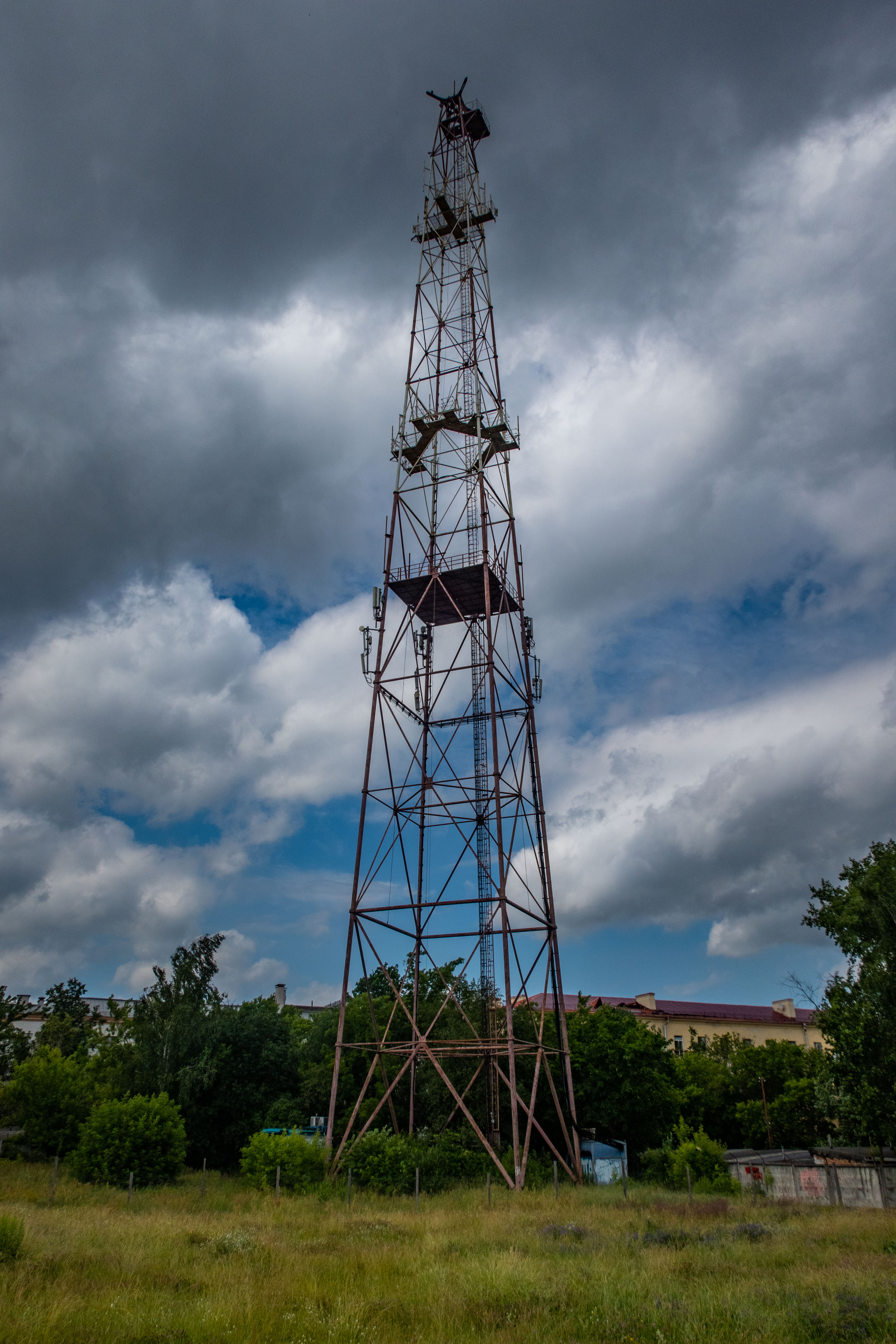
Soviet-era jammer tower in Minsk

The Soviet Union started jamming Western radio broadcasts to itself in 1948. The primary targets of jamming have been the BBC External Broadcasting Services, Voice of America (VOA) and especially RFE/RL. Western nations had allowed jamming prior to World War II, but in the post-War era, the Western view has been that jamming violates the principle of freedom of information, while the Soviet view has been that under the international law principle of national sovereignty, jamming is an acceptable response to foreign radio broadcasts.

During much of the Cold War, Soviet (and Eastern Bloc) jamming of some Western broadcasters led to a "power race" in which broadcasters and jammers alike repeatedly increased their transmission power, utilising highly directional antennas and adding extra frequencies (known as "barrage" or "frequency diversity" broadcasting) to the already heavily overcrowded shortwave bands to such an extent that many broadcasters not directly targeted by the jammers (including pro-Soviet stations) suffered from the rising levels of noise and interference.

There were also periods when China and the Soviet Union jammed each other's programmes. The Soviet Union also jammed Albanian programmes and its own Warsaw Pact's programmes at times.

Some parts of the world were more affected by these broadcasting practices than others

- Eurasia (worst affected, including mediumwave frequencies particularly 720 kHz used by RFE)
- North Asia, Americas and Sub-Saharan Africa (partly affected)
- Australasia, South America (rarely affected)

Meanwhile, some listeners in the Soviet Union and Eastern Bloc devised ingenious methods (such as homemade directional loop antennas) to hear the Western stations through the noise. Because radio propagation on shortwave can be difficult to predict reliably, listeners sometimes found that there were times when the jamming was particularly ineffective because radio fading (due to atmospheric conditions) was affecting the jamming signals but favouring the broadcasts (a phenomenon sometimes dubbed "twilight immunity"). At other times, the reverse was the case. There were also times when jamming transmitters were (temporarily) off air due to breakdowns or maintenance. The Soviets (and most of their Eastern Bloc allies) used two types of jamming transmitter. Skywave jamming covered a large area, but for the reasons described was of limited effectiveness. Groundwave jamming was more effective, but only over a small area, and was thus used only in/near major cities throughout the Eastern Bloc. Both types of jamming were less effective on higher shortwave frequencies (above 15 MHz); however, many radios sold on the domestic market in the Soviet Union did not tune these higher bands. Skywave jamming was usually accompanied by morse signals in order to enable (coded) identification of the jamming station so that Soviet monitoring posts could assess the effectiveness of each station.

In 1987, after decades of generally refusing to acknowledge that such jamming was even taking place, the Soviets finally stopped jamming western broadcasts with the exception of RFE/RL which continued to be jammed for several months into 1988. Previously there had been periods when some individual Eastern Bloc countries refrained from jamming Western broadcasts but this varied widely by time and country. In general, outside of the Soviet Union itself, Bulgaria was one of the most prolific operators of jamming transmitters in the Eastern Bloc with East Germany and Yugoslavia the least.

While western governments may have occasionally considered jamming broadcasts from Eastern Bloc stations, it was generally accepted that doing so would be a pointless exercise. Ownership of shortwave radios was less common in western countries than in the Soviet Union where, due to the vast physical size of the country, many domestic stations were relayed on shortwave as it was the only practical way to cover remote areas. Additionally, western governments were generally less afraid of intellectual competition from the Eastern Bloc.

In Francoist Spain, the dictatorship jammed for decades Radio España Independiente, the radio station of the Communist Party of Spain which broadcast from Moscow (1941–1955), Bucharest (1955–1977) and East Berlin. It was the most important clandestine broadcaster in Spain and the regime considered it a threat, since it allowed its citizens to bypass the censorship of the local media. Broadcasts from East Germany to South Africa were also jammed as were broadcasts from the USSR to Chile.

In Latin America, there were instances of communist radio stations such as Radio Venceremos being jammed, allegedly by the CIA, while there were short lived instances where Britain jammed some Egyptian (during the Suez Crisis), Greek (prior to Cyprus gaining independence) and Rhodesian stations. During the early years of the Northern Ireland troubles, the British army regularly jammed broadcasts from both Republican and Loyalist paramilitary groups.

=== Post Cold War (1989–present) ===
==== China ====
In 2002, China acquired standard short-wave radio-broadcasting equipment designed for general public radio-broadcasting and technical support from Thales Broadcast Multimedia, a former subsidiary of the French state-owned company Thales Group.

- Thales jamming technology operates only at power levels below 500 kW (for its shortwave jamming products).
- Adele Milna (BSEE) of Continental Electronics (in an audio file held at shortwave.org) claims that China has duplicated his company's 100 kW, 250 kW shortwave transmitters. It is unclear if these products were indeed duplicated or if broadcast jamming (as opposed to future product sales) were a reason for the duplication.

==== Iran ====
Debates have been raised in Iran regarding the possible health hazards of satellite jamming. Iranian officials including the health minister have claimed that jamming has no health risk for humans. However, the minister of communication has recently admitted that satellite jamming has 'serious effects' and has called for identification of jamming stations so they can put a stop to this practice. The government has generally denied any involvement in jamming and claimed they are sent from unknown sources. According to some sources, IRGC is the organization behind satellite jamming in Iran.

==== Russia ====
The Russian Armed Forces have, since the summer of 2015, begun using a multi-functional EW weapon system in Ukraine, known as Borisoglebsk 2. It is postulated that this system has defeated communications in parts of that country, including mobile telephony and GPS systems.

==== Other countries ====
- Since the early 1960s, the practice of radio jamming has been very common in Cuba, blocking not only American government funded radio stations (such as Voice of America) but also Ham radio signals, and stations owned and/or operated by (or selling airtime to) Cuban exile groups transmitting from Miami, such as La Cubanisima, Radio Mambi, WWFE La Poderosa and Cadena Azul. The same practice has been applied to Radio y Televisión Martí, operated by the U.S. Information Agency since 1985.
- North Korea and South Korea still regularly jam some of each other's radio (and sometimes television) stations.
- Several Middle Eastern countries (particularly Iran) jam shortwave broadcasts (and even occasionally attempt to jam satellite TV signals) targeted at their countries.
- Pakistan has contemplated jamming pirate radio stations operated by the Taliban in all jails across Pakistan. This decision has led to an outcry from Pakistani cellular operators, who state that most of the jails lie in urban areas with a resultant impact on the cellular service of all operators in the adjacent area of jails.
- Ethiopia has jammed the DW and VOA transmissions as well as Ethiopian Satellite Television (ESAT) and Eritrean radio stations.
- Vietnam jams the Vietnamese service of Radio Free Asia, Radio Đáp Lời Song Núi, some FEBC programs, mostly in Vietnamese minority languages as well as Radio Sweden with a "siren" jammer and "bubble" jammer on FM frequencies.
- In Nigeria, the Nigerian Broadcasting Commission has claimed it jams the signal of Radio Biafra.
- In South Africa, the use of wireless signal jammers is illegal. There is a single exception to this rule. South Africa's State Security Cluster may, in certain instances, employ signal jammers.
- In Singapore, a local Indonesian Batam Hang FM 106.0 MHz based Islamic radio station of Indonesia radio stations has been jammed. It transmits up to Singapore and Johor Bahru in Malaysia at 10 kW transmission power. Hang FM 106.0 MHz was accused by Singapore authorities of spreading extremist and terrorist propaganda. Four Singaporeans were detained by police under the Internal Security Act (ISA) when they attempted to move to Syria and join ISIS. Radio Hang FM has denied this accusation. Station Manager of Hang FM Radio, Abu Yusuf, rejected any link between Hang FM Radio and radicalism. According to him, the broadcast material is also in accordance with the understanding of Ahlus sunnah wal Jamaah, which apart from rejecting radicalism, terrorism, and especially ISIS, also rejects other ideas or actions that are contrary to the basic principles of the peace-loving Islamic religion. Meanwhile, Deputy Chair of the Riau Islands Regional Indonesian Broadcasting Commission (KPID), Suyono, said that while under KPID supervision, in its broadcasts Radio Hang FM actually rejected radicalism and terrorism. Singapore also considered banning Hang FM website.

== In fiction ==
Radio jamming (or "comm jamming") is a common plot element in the Star Wars franchise. In Star Wars: Episode VI - Return of the Jedi, when the Rebel fleet approaches the Galactic Empire's force, believing themselves to be launching a surprise attack, General Lando Calrissian realizes the Empire is jamming their signals, and therefore know they are approaching.

In the film Star Trek II, after receiving a distress call from the space station Regula I, Captain Kirk attempts to establish communications, but the Enterprise's comm officer Lt. Uhura reports that further transmissions are "jammed at the source".

== See also ==
- Radar jamming and deception
- Association of Old Crows
- Culture jamming
- Electronic warfare
- Aspidistra (transmitter)
- Eastern Bloc information dissemination
- Mobile phone jammer
- Microphone blocker
- Radio jamming in China
- Radio jamming in Korea
