= Mobile phone jammer =

Device designed to disrupt mobile network communication within an area

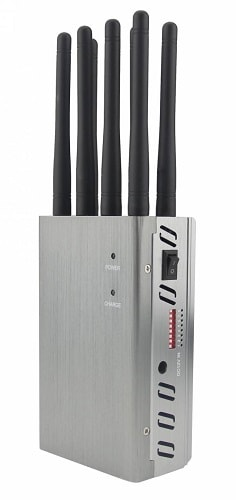
Example of a mobile phone jammer, produced by Jammerspro

A mobile phone jammer or blocker is a device which deliberately transmits signals on the same radio frequencies as mobile phones, disrupting the communication between the phone and the cell-phone base station, effectively disabling mobile phones within the range of the jammer, preventing them from receiving signals and from transmitting them. Jammers can be used in practically any location, but are found primarily in places where a phone call would be particularly disruptive because silence is expected, such as entertainment venues.

Because they disrupt the operations of legitimate mobile phone services, the use of such blocking devices is illegal in many jurisdictions, especially without a licence. When operational, such devices also block access to emergency services.

== Legality ==
Since these jammers actively broadcast radio signals, they are illegal in many jurisdictions.

- Australia: Illegal to operate, supply or possess unless the user has a PMTS C telecommunications licence under the Radiocommunications (Interpretation) Determination 2000.
- Brazil: Illegal, but installation in prisons has been proposed.
- Canada: Illegal under sections 4, 9, and 10 of the Radiocommunication Act, except by federal law-enforcement agencies who have obtained approval.
- European Union: Illegal, according to the European Commission's "Interpretation of the Directive 1999/5/EC".
- France: Legal until 2012 in cinemas, concert halls and performance venues, but illegal since 2012.
- India: Illegal except for use by security and military agencies, and use in prisons, theatres, mosques, and schools with prior permit and jamming limited to the perimeter with zero leakage.
- Iran: Illegal to use without permits.
- Israel: Illegal.
- Italy: Illegal both to own and use, according to the Penal Code offenders are liable to be punished with imprisonment for up to eight years. Can be used in exceptional cases by Italian law enforcement agencies, such as Polizia Di Stato and Carabinieri.
- Malaysia: Illegal to use. Offenders jamming the cellular network frequency in their premises can be fined a maximum of RM500,000 or jailed a maximum of five years, or both.
- New Zealand: Illegal to sell, manufacture or use. Legal inside prisons by Department of Corrections, although are no longer used.
- Pakistan: Illegal to use without permission. Individuals or organisations must obtain No Objection Certificates (NOCs) before installation of such devices.
- Russia: Legal, planned to be used in schools.
- Singapore: Illegal to manufacture, import, use or sell radio jamming equipment other than by or for supply to a permitted person.
- South Africa: Illegal, except for national security agencies. No other organisation is allowed to jam cellular signals, and any device which is used to jam signals is illegal.
- Sweden: Illegal except inside prisons and for military use.
- United Kingdom: Illegal to use, but legal to own. Having been proposed by prison inspectors, installation and use in prisons has been legal since the end of 2012.
- United States: Mobile phone blocking devices are used by federal officials under certain circumstances. For radio communications, it is illegal to operate, manufacture, import, or offer for sale (including advertising) (Communications Act of 1934). Blocking radio communications in public can carry fines of up to $112,000 and/or imprisonment of up to one year. The Homeland Security Act of 2002 may override the Communications Act of 1934, and an exception to this law was proposed for prisons under the Cellphone Jamming Reform Act of 2023 but it failed to pass.

== See also ==
- IMSI-catcher
- GPS jamming
- Radio jamming
- Microphone blocker
