= Moon moth =

Moon moth is a general term describing imagos (winged adults) of several Saturniinae species, having as a distinctive trait large round or near-round spots on the forewings and hindwings - hence "moon".

- Moths of the subfamily Saturniinae
  - Actias, a genus native to Asia and America, includes North America Luna moth (Actias luna)
  - Argema, a genus native to Africa, includes Comet moth (Argema mittrei)
  - Copiopteryx, a genus native to Mexico, Central America and South America
  - Eudaemonia (moth), a genus native to Sub-Saharan Africa
  - Graellsia isabellae (Spanish moon moth), a species native to Europe
- "The Moon Moth" is a science fiction short story by Jack Vance
