= Animal echolocation =

Method used by several animal species to determine location using sound

A depiction of the ultrasound signals emitted by a bat, and the echo from a nearby object

Echolocation, also called bio sonar, is a biological active sonar used by several animal groups, both in the air and underwater. Echolocating animals emit calls and listen to the echoes of those calls that return from various objects near them. They use these echoes to locate and identify the objects. Echolocation is used for navigation, foraging, and hunting prey.

Echolocation calls can be frequency modulated (FM, varying in pitch during the call) or constant frequency (CF). FM offers precise range discrimination to localize the prey, at the cost of reduced operational range. CF allows both the prey's velocity and its movements to be detected by means of the Doppler effect. FM may be best for close, cluttered environments, while CF may be better in open environments or for hunting while perched.

Echolocating animals include mammals, especially odontocetes (toothed whales) and some bat species, and, using simpler forms, species in other groups such as shrews. A few bird species in two cave-dwelling bird groups echolocate, namely cave swiftlets and the oilbird.

Some prey animals that are hunted by echolocating bats take active countermeasures to avoid capture. These include predator avoidance, attack deflection, and the use of ultrasonic clicks, which have evolved multiple functions including aposematism, mimicry of chemically defended species, and echolocation jamming.

== Early research ==
The term echolocation had been coined by 1944 by the American zoologist Donald Griffin, who, with Robert Galambos, first demonstrated the phenomenon in bats. As Griffin described in his book, the 18th century Italian scientist Lazzaro Spallanzani had, by means of a series of elaborate experiments, concluded that when bats fly at night, they rely on some sense besides vision, but he did not discover that the other sense was hearing. The Swiss physician and naturalist Louis Jurine repeated Spallanzani's experiments (using different species of bat), and concluded in 1798 that when bats hunt at night, they rely on hearing. In 1908, Walter Louis Hahn confirmed Spallanzani's and Jurine's findings.

In 1912, the inventor Hiram Maxim independently proposed that bats used sound below the human auditory range to avoid obstacles. In 1920, the English physiologist Hamilton Hartridge correctly proposed instead that bats used frequencies above the range of human hearing.

Echolocation in odontocetes (toothed whales) was not properly described until two decades after Griffin and Galambos' work, by Schevill and McBride in 1956. However, in 1953, Jacques Yves Cousteau suggested in his first book, The Silent World, that porpoises had something like sonar, judging by their navigational abilities.

== Principles ==
Echolocation is active sonar, using sounds made by the animal itself. Ranging is achieved by measuring the time delay between the animal's own sound emission and any echoes that return from the environment. The relative intensity of sound received at each ear, as well as the time delay between arrival at the two ears, provide information about the horizontal angle (azimuth) from which the reflected sound waves arrive.

Unlike some human-made sonars that rely on many extremely narrow beams and many receivers to localize a target (multibeam sonar), animal echolocation has only one transmitter and two receivers (the ears) positioned slightly apart. The echoes returning to the ears arrive at different times and at different intensities, depending on the position of the object generating the echoes. The time and loudness differences are used by the animals to perceive distance and direction. With echolocation, the bat or other animal can tell, not only where it is going, but also how big another animal is, what kind of animal it is, and other features.

=== Acoustic features ===
Describing the diversity of echolocation calls requires examination of the frequency and temporal features of the calls. It is the variations in these aspects that produce echolocation calls suited for different acoustic environments and hunting behaviors. The calls of bats have been most intensively researched, but the principles apply to all echolocation calls.

Bat call frequencies range from as low as 11 kHz to as high as 212 kHz. Insectivorous aerial-hawking bats, those that chase prey in the open air, have a call frequency between 20 kHz and 60 kHz, because it is the frequency that gives the best range and image acuity and makes them less conspicuous to insects. However, low frequencies are adaptive for some species with different prey and environments. Euderma maculatum, a bat species that feeds on moths, uses a particularly low frequency of 12.7 kHz that cannot be heard by moths.

Echolocation calls can be composed of two different types of frequency structure: frequency modulated (FM) sweeps, and constant frequency (CF) tones. A particular call can consist of one, the other, or both structures. An FM sweep is a broadband signal – that is, it contains a downward sweep through a range of frequencies. A CF tone is a narrowband signal: the sound stays constant at one frequency throughout its duration.

Echolocation calls in bats have been measured at intensities anywhere between 60 and 140 decibels. Certain bat species can modify their call intensity mid-call, lowering the intensity as they approach objects that reflect sound strongly. This prevents the returning echo from deafening the bat. High-intensity calls such as those from aerial-hawking bats (133 dB) are adaptive to hunting in open skies. Their high intensity calls are necessary to even have moderate detection of surroundings because air has a high absorption of ultrasound and because insects' size only provide a small target for sound reflection. Additionally, the so-called "whispering bats" have adapted low-amplitude echolocation so that their prey, moths, which are able to hear echolocation calls, are less able to detect and avoid an oncoming bat.

A single echolocation call (a call being a single continuous trace on a sound spectrogram, and a series of calls comprising a sequence or pass) can last anywhere from less than 3 to over 50 milliseconds in duration. Pulse duration is around 3 milliseconds in FM bats such as Phyllostomidae and some Vespertilionidae; between 7 and 16 milliseconds in Quasi-constant-frequency (QCF) bats such as other Vespertilionidae, Emballonuridae, and Molossidae; and between 11 milliseconds (Hipposideridae) and 52 milliseconds (Rhinolophidae) in CF bats. Duration depends also on the stage of prey-catching behavior that the bat is engaged in, usually decreasing when the bat is in the final stages of prey capture – this enables the bat to call more rapidly without overlap of call and echo. Reducing duration comes at the cost of having less total sound available for reflecting off objects and being heard by the bat.

The time interval between subsequent echolocation calls (or pulses) determines two aspects of a bat's perception. First, it establishes how quickly the bat's auditory scene information is updated. For example, bats increase the repetition rate of their calls (that is, decrease the pulse interval) as they home in on a target. This allows the bat to get new information regarding the target's location at a faster rate when it needs it most. Secondly, the pulse interval determines the maximum range that bats can detect objects. This is because bats can only keep track of the echoes from one call at a time; as soon as they make another call they stop listening for echoes from the previously made call. For example, a pulse interval of 100 ms (typical of a bat searching for insects) allows sound to travel in air roughly 34 meters so a bat can only detect objects as far away as 17 meters (the sound has to travel out and back). With a pulse interval of 5 ms (typical of a bat in the final moments of a capture attempt), the bat can only detect objects up to 85 cm away. Therefore, the bat constantly has to make a choice between getting new information updated quickly and detecting objects far away.

=== Tradeoff between FM and CF ===
==== FM signal advantages ====
Echolocation call produced by Pipistrellus pipistrellus, an FM bat. The ultrasonic call has been "heterodyned" – multiplied by a constant frequency to produce frequency subtraction, and thus an audible sound – by a bat detector. A key feature of the recording is the increase in the repetition rate of the call as the bat nears its target – this is called the "terminal buzz".

The major advantage conferred by an FM signal is extremely precise range discrimination, or localization, of the target. J. A. Simmons demonstrated this effect with a series of experiments that showed how bats using FM signals could distinguish between two separate targets even when the targets were less than half a millimeter apart. This ability is due to the broadband sweep of the signal, which allows for better resolution of the time delay between the call and the returning echo, thereby improving the cross correlation of the two. If harmonic frequencies are added to the FM signal, then this localization becomes even more precise.

One possible disadvantage of the FM signal is a decreased operational range of the call. Because the energy of the call is spread out among many frequencies, the distance at which the FM-bat can detect targets is limited. This is in part because any echo returning at a particular frequency can only be evaluated for a brief fraction of a millisecond, as the fast downward sweep of the call does not remain at any one frequency for long.

==== CF signal advantages ====
The structure of a CF signal is adaptive in that it allows the CF-bat to detect both the velocity of a target, and the fluttering of a target's wings as Doppler shifted frequencies. A Doppler shift is an alteration in sound wave frequency, and is produced in two relevant situations: when the bat and its target are moving relative to each other, and when the target's wings are oscillating back and forth. CF-bats must compensate for Doppler shifts, lowering the frequency of their call in response to echoes of elevated frequency – this ensures that the returning echo remains at the frequency to which the ears of the bat are most finely tuned. The oscillation of a target's wings also produces amplitude shifts, which gives a CF-bat additional help in distinguishing a flying target from a stationary one. The horseshoe bats hunt in this way.

Additionally, because the signal energy of a CF call is concentrated into a narrow frequency band, the operational range of the call is much greater than that of an FM signal. This relies on the fact that echoes returning within the narrow frequency band can be summed over the entire length of the call, which maintains a constant frequency for up to 100 milliseconds.

==== Acoustic environments of FM and CF signals ====
An FM component is excellent for hunting prey while flying in close, cluttered environments. Two aspects of the FM signal account for this fact: the precise target localization conferred by the broadband signal, and the short duration of the call. The first of these is essential because in a cluttered environment, the bats must be able to resolve their prey from large amounts of background noise. The 3D localization abilities of the broadband signal enable the bat to do exactly that, providing it with what Simmons and Stein (1980) call a "clutter rejection strategy". This strategy is further improved by the use of harmonics, which, as previously stated, enhance the localization properties of the call. The short duration of the FM call is also best in close, cluttered environments because it enables the bat to emit many calls extremely rapidly without overlap. This means that the bat can get an almost continuous stream of information – essential when objects are close, because they will pass by quickly – without confusing which echo corresponds to which call.

A CF component is often used by bats hunting for prey while flying in open, clutter-free environments, or by bats that wait on perches for their prey to appear. The success of the former strategy is due to two aspects of the CF call, both of which confer excellent prey-detection abilities. First, the greater working range of the call allows bats to detect targets present at great distances – a common situation in open environments. Second, the length of the call is also suited for targets at great distances: in this case, there is a decreased chance that the long call will overlap with the returning echo. The latter strategy is made possible by the fact that the long, narrowband call allows the bat to detect Doppler shifts, which would be produced by an insect moving either towards or away from a perched bat.

== Taxonomic range ==
Echolocation occurs in a variety of mammals and birds as described below. It evolved repeatedly, an example of convergent evolution.

- Tetrapoda
  - Mammals
    - Boreoeutheria
      - - Rodentia
          Chinese pygmy dormice
      - Laurasiatheria
        - Scrotifera
          - Bats
          - Whales
        - Eulipotyphla
          - Shrews
          - Solenodons
    - Afrotheria
      - Tenrecs
  - Birds
    - Oilbirds
    - Swiftlets

=== Bats ===
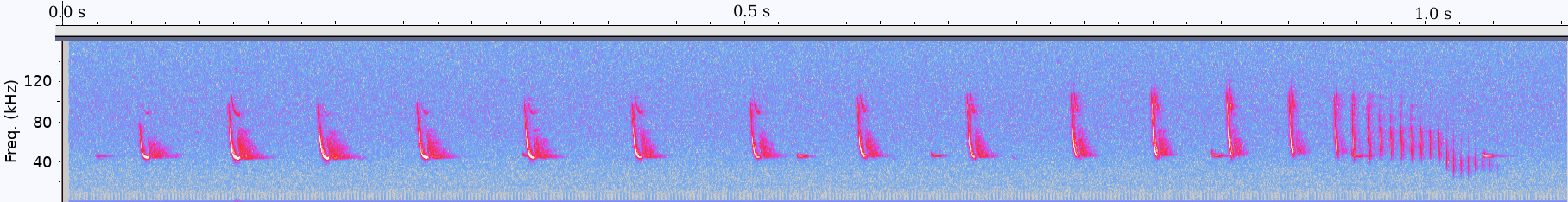
Spectrogram of Pipistrellus pipistrellus bat vocalizations during prey approach. The recording covers a total of 1.1 seconds; lower main frequency c. 45 kHz (as typical for a common pipistrelle). About 150 milliseconds before final contact time between and duration of calls are becoming much shorter ("feeding buzz"). Corresponding audio file:

Pipistrellus calls
Recording of Pipistrellus; echolocation call followed by a social call.

Echolocating bats use echolocation to navigate and forage, often in total darkness. They generally emerge from their roosts in caves, attics, or trees at dusk and hunt for insects into the night. Using echolocation, bats can determine how far away an object is, the object's size, shape and density, and the direction (if any) that an object is moving. Their use of echolocation, along with powered flight, allows them to occupy a niche where there are often many insects (that come out at night since there are fewer predators then), less competition for food, and fewer species that may prey on the bats themselves.

Most echolocating bats generate ultrasound via the larynx and emit the sound through the open mouth or, much more rarely, the nose. The latter is most pronounced in the horseshoe bats (Rhinolophus spp.). Bat echolocation calls range in frequency from 14,000 to well over 100,000 Hz, mostly beyond the range of the human ear (typical human hearing range is considered to be from 20 Hz to 20,000 Hz). Bats may estimate the elevation of targets by interpreting the interference patterns caused by the echoes reflecting from the tragus, a flap of skin in the external ear. Other bat species use more primitive forms of echolocation—instead of generating ultrasound laryngeally, some species in the genus Rousettus use tongue clicks, known as lingual echolocation. In some other megabat species such as the cave nectar bat, lesser short-nosed fruit bat, and long-tongued fruit bat, they generate clicking sounds with their wings during flight which allows them to navigate via echolocation in total darkness, though with less precision than laryngeal echolocation.

Individual bat species echolocate within specific frequency ranges that suit their environment and prey types. This has sometimes been used by researchers to identify bats flying in an area simply by recording their calls with ultrasonic recorders known as "bat detectors". However, echolocation calls are not always species specific and some bats overlap in the type of calls they use so recordings of echolocation calls cannot be used to identify all bats. Researchers in several countries have developed "bat call libraries" that contain "reference call" recordings of local bat species to assist with identification.

When searching for prey they produce sounds at a low rate (10–20 clicks/second). During the search phase the sound emission is coupled to respiration, which is again coupled to the wingbeat. This coupling appears to dramatically conserve energy as there is little to no additional energetic cost of echolocation to flying bats. After detecting a potential prey item, echolocating bats increase the rate of pulses, ending with the terminal buzz, at rates as high as 200 clicks/second. During approach to a detected target, the duration of the sounds is gradually decreased, as is the energy of the sound.

==== Bat evolution ====
Bats evolved at the start of the Eocene epoch, around 64 mya. The Yangochiroptera appeared some 55 mya, and the Rhinolophoidea some 52 mya.

There are two hypotheses about the evolution of echolocation in bats. The first suggests that laryngeal echolocation evolved twice, or more, in Chiroptera, at least once in the Yangochiroptera and at least once in the horseshoe bats (Rhinolophidae):

- Chiroptera
  - - CF (Early Eocene)
      Yangochiroptera
    - - - Pteropodidae
          - - fruit bats
            - tongue‑clicking
              Rousettus
        - Rhinolophoidea FM (Early Eocene)
          - Megadermatidae
          - horseshoe bats

The second proposes that laryngeal echolocation had a single origin in Chiroptera, i.e. that it was basal to the group, and was subsequently lost in the family Pteropodidae. Later, the genus Rousettus in the Pteropodidae family evolved a different mechanism of echolocation using a system of tongue-clicking:

- Chiroptera CF (Earliest Eocene)
  - - Yangochiroptera
    - - - Pteropodidae CF lost
          - - fruit bats
            - tongue‑clicking
              Rousettus
        - Rhinolophoidea FM (Early Eocene)
          - Megadermatidae
          - horseshoe bats

==== Calls and ecology ====
Echolocating bats occupy a diverse set of ecological conditions; they can be found living in environments as different as Europe and Madagascar, and hunting for food sources as different as insects, frogs, nectar, fruit, and blood. The characteristics of an echolocation call are adapted to the particular environment, hunting behavior, and food source of the particular bat. The adaptation of echolocation calls to ecological factors is constrained by the phylogenetic relationship of the bats, leading to a process known as descent with modification, and resulting in the diversity of the Chiroptera today. Bats can inadvertently jam each other, and in some situations they may stop calling to avoid jamming.

Flying insects are a common source of food for echolocating bats and some insects (moths in particular) can hear the calls of predatory bats. However the evolution of hearing organs in moths predates the origins of bats, so while many moths do listen for approaching bat echolocation their ears did not originally evolve in response to selective pressures from bats. These moth adaptations provide selective pressure for bats to improve their insect-hunting systems and this cycle culminates in a moth-bat "evolutionary arms race".

==== Neural mechanisms ====
Because bats use echolocation to orient themselves and to locate objects, their auditory systems are adapted for this purpose, highly specialized for sensing and interpreting the stereotyped echolocation calls characteristic of their own species. This specialization is evident from the inner ear up to the highest levels of information processing in the auditory cortex.

===== Inner ear and primary sensory neurons =====
Both CF and FM bats have specialized inner ears which allow them to hear sounds in the ultrasonic range, far outside the range of human hearing. Although in most other aspects, the bat's auditory organs are similar to those of most other mammals, certain bats (horseshoe bats, Rhinolophus spp. and the moustached bat, Pteronotus parnelii) with a constant frequency (CF) component to their call (known as high duty cycle bats) do have a few additional adaptations for detecting the predominant frequency (and harmonics) of the CF vocalization. These include a narrow frequency "tuning" of the inner ear organs, with an especially large area responding to the frequency of the bat's returning echoes.

The basilar membrane within the cochlea contains the first of these specializations for echo information processing. In bats that use CF signals, the section of the membrane that responds to the frequency of returning echoes is much larger than the region of response for any other frequency. For example, in the greater horseshoe bat, Rhinolophus ferrumequinum, there is a disproportionately lengthened and thickened section of the membrane that responds to sounds around 83 kHz, the constant frequency of the echo produced by the bat's call. This area of high sensitivity to a specific, narrow range of frequency is known as an "acoustic fovea".

Echolocating bats have cochlear hairs that are especially resistant to intense noise. Cochlear hair cells are essential for hearing sensitivity, and can be damaged by intense noise. As bats are regularly exposed to intense noise through echolocation, resistance to degradation by intense noise is necessary.

Further along the auditory pathway, the movement of the basilar membrane results in the stimulation of primary auditory neurons. Many of these neurons are specifically "tuned" (respond most strongly) to the narrow frequency range of returning echoes of CF calls. Because of the large size of the acoustic fovea, the number of neurons responding to this region, and thus to the echo frequency, is especially high.

===== Inferior colliculus =====
In the Inferior colliculus, a structure in the bat's midbrain, information from lower in the auditory processing pathway is integrated and sent on to the auditory cortex. As George Pollak and others showed in a series of papers in 1977, the interneurons in this region have a very high level of sensitivity to time differences, since the time delay between a call and the returning echo tells the bat its distance from the target object. While most neurons respond more quickly to stronger stimuli, collicular neurons maintain their timing accuracy even as signal intensity changes. These interneurons are specialized for time sensitivity in several ways. First, when activated, they generally respond with only one or two action potentials. This short duration of response allows their action potentials to give a specific indication of the moment when the stimulus arrived, and to respond accurately to stimuli that occur close in time to one another. The neurons have a very low threshold of activation – they respond quickly even to weak stimuli. Finally, for FM signals, each interneuron is tuned to a specific frequency within the sweep, as well as to that same frequency in the following echo. There is specialization for the CF component of the call at this level as well. The high proportion of neurons responding to the frequency of the acoustic fovea actually increases at this level.

===== Auditory cortex =====
The auditory cortex in bats is quite large in comparison with other mammals. Various characteristics of sound are processed by different regions of the cortex, each providing different information about the location or movement of a target object. Most of the existing studies on information processing in the auditory cortex of the bat have been done by Nobuo Suga on the mustached bat, Pteronotus parnellii. This bat's call has both CF tone and FM sweep components.

Suga and his colleagues have shown that the cortex contains a series of "maps" of auditory information, each of which is organized systematically based on characteristics of sound such as frequency and amplitude. The neurons in these areas respond only to a specific combination of frequency and timing (sound-echo delay), and are known as combination-sensitive neurons.

The systematically organized maps in the auditory cortex respond to various aspects of the echo signal, such as its delay and its velocity. These regions are composed of "combination sensitive" neurons that require at least two specific stimuli to elicit a response. The neurons vary systematically across the maps, which are organized by acoustic features of the sound and can be two dimensional. The different features of the call and its echo are used by the bat to determine important characteristics of their prey. The maps include:

Auditory cortex of a bat A FM-FM area B CF-CF area C Amplitude-sensitive area D Frequency-sensitive area E DSCF area

- FM-FM area: This region of the cortex contains FM-FM combination-sensitive neurons. These cells respond only to the combination of two FM sweeps: a call and its echo. The neurons in the FM-FM region are often referred to as "delay-tuned", since each responds to a specific time delay between the original call and the echo, in order to find the distance from the target object (the range). Each neuron also shows specificity for one harmonic in the original call and a different harmonic in the echo. The neurons within the FM-FM area of the cortex of Pteronotus are organized into columns, in which the delay time is constant vertically but increases across the horizontal plane. The result is that range is encoded by location on the cortex, and increases systematically across the FM-FM area.
- CF-CF area: Another kind of combination-sensitive neuron is the CF-CF neuron. These respond best to the combination of a CF call containing two given frequencies – a call at 30 kHz (CF1) and one of its additional harmonics around 60 or 90 kHz (CF2 or CF3) – and the corresponding echoes. Thus, within the CF-CF region, the changes in echo frequency caused by the Doppler shift can be compared to the frequency of the original call to calculate the bat's velocity relative to its target object. As in the FM-FM area, information is encoded by its location within the map-like organization of the region. The CF-CF area is first split into the distinct CF1-CF2 and CF1-CF3 areas. Within each area, the CF1 frequency is organized on an axis, perpendicular to the CF2 or CF3 frequency axis. In the resulting grid, each neuron codes for a certain combination of frequencies that is indicative of a specific velocity
- Doppler shifted constant frequency (DSCF) area: This large section of the cortex is a map of the acoustic fovea, organized by frequency and by amplitude. Neurons in this region respond to CF signals that have been Doppler shifted (in other words, echoes only) and are within the same narrow frequency range to which the acoustic fovea responds. For Pteronotus, this is around 61 kHz. This area is organized into columns, which are arranged radially based on frequency. Within a column, each neuron responds to a specific combination of frequency and amplitude. This brain region is necessary for frequency discrimination.

=== Whales ===
Diagram illustrating sound generation, propagation and reception in a toothed whale. Outgoing sounds are cyan and incoming ones are green.

Biosonar is valuable to both toothed whales (suborder Odontoceti), including dolphins, porpoises, river dolphins, killer whales and sperm whales, and baleen whales (suborder Mysticeti), including right, bowhead, pygmy right, and gray whales and rorquals, because they live in an underwater habitat that has favourable acoustic characteristics and where vision is often extremely limited in range due to absorption or turbidity. Odontocetes are generally able to hear sounds at ultrasonic frequencies while mysticetes hear sounds within the infrasonic frequency regime.

==== Whale evolution ====
Cetacean evolution consisted of three main radiations. Throughout the middle and late Eocene periods (49–31.5 million years ago), archaeocetes, primitive toothed Cetacea that arose from terrestrial mammals, were the only cetaceans. They did not echolocate, but had slightly adapted underwater hearing. By the late middle Eocene, acoustically isolated ear bones had evolved to give basilosaurid archaeocetes directional underwater hearing at low to mid frequencies. With the extinction of archaeocetes at the onset of the Oligocene (33.9–23 million years ago), two new lineages evolved in a second radiation. Early mysticetes (baleen whales) and odontocetes appeared in the middle Oligocene in New Zealand. Extant odontocetes are monophyletic (a single evolutionary group), but echolocation evolved twice, convergently: once in Xenorophus, an Oligocene stem odontocete, and once in the crown odontocetes.

- - Cetacea
    - - Odontoceti Oligocene
        - echolocation late Oligocene
          Xenorophus †
        - echolocation
          - Physeteroidea
          - - Ziphiidae, etc.
            - adaptive radiation Miocene
              Delphinoidea
      - echolocation middle Oligocene
        Mysticeti
    - directional u/water hearing mid/late Eocene
      Basilosauridae †

Cetacean evolution timeline
Epoch	Start date	Event
Miocene	23 mya	Adaptive radiation, esp. of dolphins
Oligocene	34 mya	Odontocetes echolocation
Eocene	49 mya	Archaeocetes underwater hearing

Physical restructuring of the oceans has played a role in the evolution of echolocation. Global cooling at the Eocene-Oligocene boundary caused a change from a greenhouse to an icehouse world. Tectonic openings created the Southern Ocean with a free flowing Antarctic Circumpolar Current. These events encouraged selection for the ability to locate and capture prey in turbid river waters, which enabled the odontocetes to invade and feed at depths below the photic zone. In particular, echolocation below the photic zone could have been a predation adaptation to diel migrating cephalopods. The family Delphinidae (dolphins) diversified in the Neogene (23–2.6 million years ago), evolving extremely specialized echolocation.

Four proteins play a major role in toothed whale echolocation. Prestin, a motor protein of the outer hair cells of the inner ear of the mammalian cochlea, is associated with hearing sensitivity. It has undergone two clear episodes of accelerated evolution in cetaceans. The first is connected to odontocete divergence, when echolocation first developed, and the second with the increase in echolocation frequency among dolphins. Tmc1 and Pjvk are proteins related to hearing sensitivity: Tmc1 is associated with hair cell development and high-frequency hearing, and Pjvk with hair cell function. Molecular evolution of Tmc1 and Pjvk indicates positive selection for echolocation in odontocetes. Cldn14, a member of the tight junction proteins which form barriers between inner ear cells, shows the same evolutionary pattern as Prestin. The two events of protein evolution, for Prestin and Cldn14, occurred at the same times as the tectonic opening of the Drake Passage (34–31 Ma) and Antarctic ice growth at the Middle Miocene climate transition (14 Ma), with the divergence of odontocetes and mysticetes occurring with the former, and the speciation of Delphinidae with the latter.

The evolution of two cranial structures may be linked to echolocation. Cranial telescoping (overlap between frontal and maxillary bones, and rearwards displacement of the nostrils) developed first in xenorophids. It evolved further in stem odontocetes, arriving at full cranial telescoping in the crown odontocetes. Movement of the nostrils may have allowed for a larger nasal apparatus and melon for echolocation. This change occurred after the divergence of the neocetes from the basilosaurids. The first shift towards cranial asymmetry occurred in the Early Oligocene, prior to the xenorophids. A xenorophid fossil (Cotylocara macei) has cranial asymmetry, and shows other indicators of echolocation. However, basal xenorophids lack cranial asymmetry, indicating that this likely evolved twice. Extant odontocetes have asymmetric nasofacial regions; generally, the median plane is shifted to the left and structures on the right are larger. Both cranial telescoping and asymmetry likely relate to sound production for echolocation.

==== Mechanism ====
Southern Alaskan resident killer whales using echolocation

Thirteen species of extant odontocetes convergently evolved narrow-band high-frequency (NBHF) echolocation in four separate events. These species include the families Kogiidae (pygmy sperm whales) and Phocoenidae (porpoises), as well as some species of the genus Lagenorhynchus, all of Cephalorhynchus, and the La Plata dolphin. NBHF is thought to have evolved as a means of predator evasion; NBHF-producing species are small relative to other odontocetes, making them viable prey to large species such as the orca. However, because three of the groups developed NBHF prior to the emergence of the orca, predation by other ancient raptorial odontocetes must have been the driving force for the development of NBHF, not predation by the orca. Orcas, and, presumably ancient raptorial odontocetes such as Acrophyseter, are unable to hear frequencies above 100 kHz.

Another reason for variation in echolocation is habitat. For all sonar systems, the limiting factor deciding whether a returning echo is detected is the echo-to-noise ratio (ENR). The ENR is given by the emitted source level (SL) plus the target strength, minus the two-way transmission loss (absorption and spreading) and the received noise. Animals will adapt either to maximize range under noise-limited conditions (increase source level) or to reduce noise clutter in a shallow and/or littered habitat (decrease source level). In cluttered habitats, such as coastal areas, prey ranges are smaller, and species such as Commerson's dolphin (Cephalorhynchus commersonii) have lowered source levels to better suit their environment.

Toothed whales emit a focused beam of high-frequency clicks in the direction that their head is pointing. Sounds are generated by passing air from the bony nares through the phonic lips. These sounds are reflected by the dense concave bone of the cranium and an air sac at its base. The focused beam is modulated by a large fatty organ known as the melon. This acts like an acoustic lens because it is composed of lipids of differing densities. Most toothed whales use clicks in a series, or click train, for echolocation, while the sperm whale may produce clicks individually. Toothed whale whistles do not appear to be used in echolocation. Different rates of click production in a click train give rise to the familiar barks, squeals and growls of the bottlenose dolphin. A click train with a repetition rate over 600 per second is called a burst pulse. In bottlenose dolphins, the auditory brain response resolves individual clicks up to 600 per second, but yields a graded response for higher repetition rates.

It has been suggested that the arrangement of the teeth of some smaller toothed whales may be an adaptation for echolocation. The teeth of a bottlenose dolphin, for example, are not arranged symmetrically when seen from a vertical plane. This asymmetry could possibly be an aid in sensing if echoes from its biosonar are coming from one side or the other; but this has not been tested experimentally.

Echoes are received using complex fatty structures around the lower jaw as the primary reception path, from where they are transmitted to the middle ear via a continuous fat body. Lateral sound may be received through fatty lobes surrounding the ears with a similar density to water. Some researchers believe that when they approach the object of interest, they protect themselves against the louder echo by quietening the emitted sound. In bats this is known to happen, but here the hearing sensitivity is also reduced close to a target.

=== Oilbirds and swiftlets ===
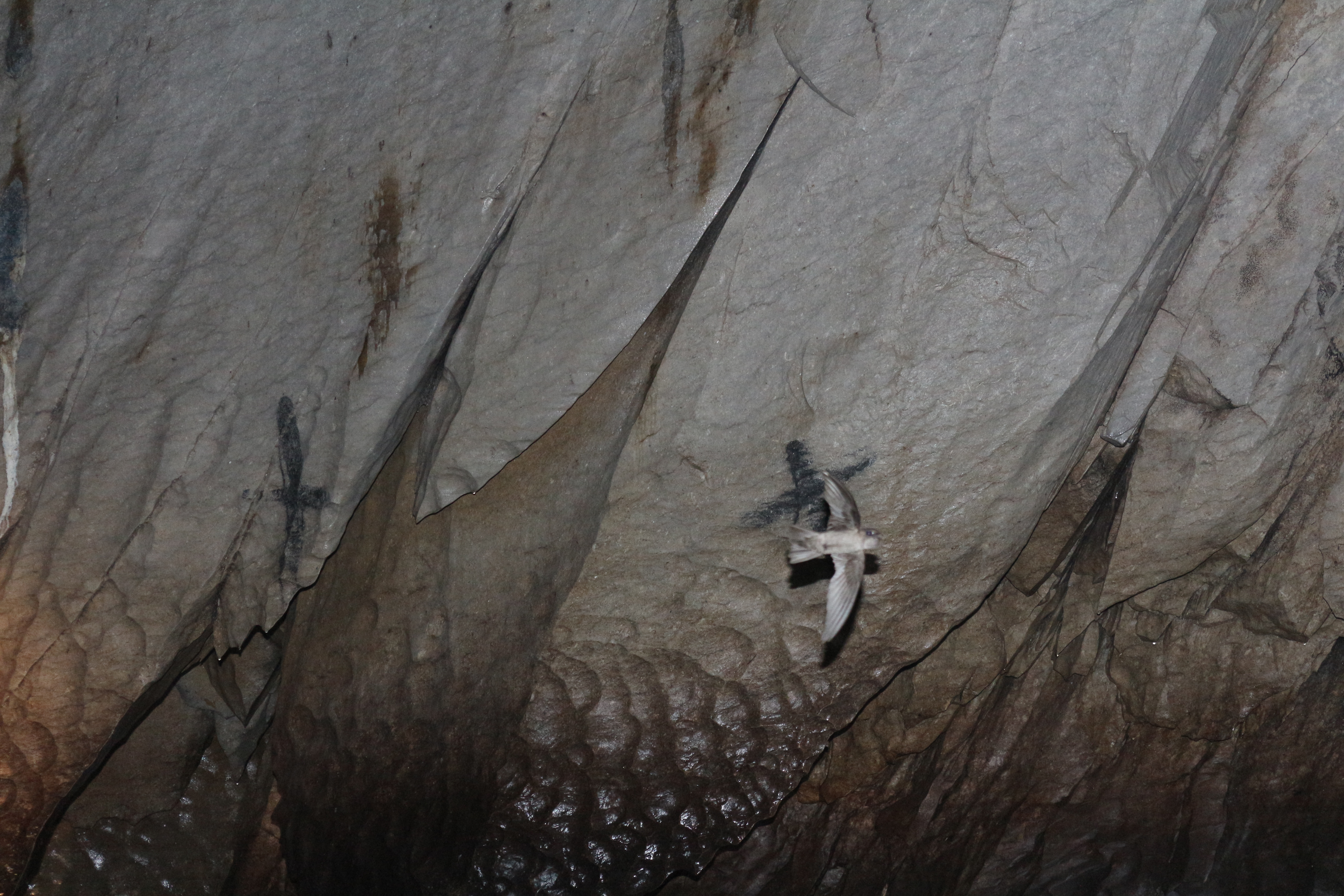
A Palawan swiftlet (Aerodramus palawanensis) flies in complete darkness inside the Puerto Princesa subterranean river cave.

Oilbirds and some species of swiftlet are known to use a relatively crude form of echolocation compared to that of bats and dolphins. These nocturnal birds emit calls while flying and use the calls to navigate through trees and caves where they live.

=== Terrestrial mammals ===
Terrestrial mammals other than bats known or thought to echolocate include shrews, the tenrecs of Madagascar, Chinese pygmy dormice, and solenodons. Shrew sounds, unlike those of bats, are low amplitude, broadband, multi-harmonic and frequency modulated. They contain no echolocation clicks with reverberations, and appear to be used for simple, close range spatial orientation. In contrast to bats, shrews use echolocation only to investigate their habitat rather than to pinpoint food. There is evidence that blinded laboratory rats can use echolocation to navigate mazes.

=== Humans ===
Some humans, particularly, blind people, have developed the skill to produce brief sounds, using their mouth, hands or other objects, and listen to the echo. This technique allows them to locate larger objects in their vicinity.

== Countermeasures ==
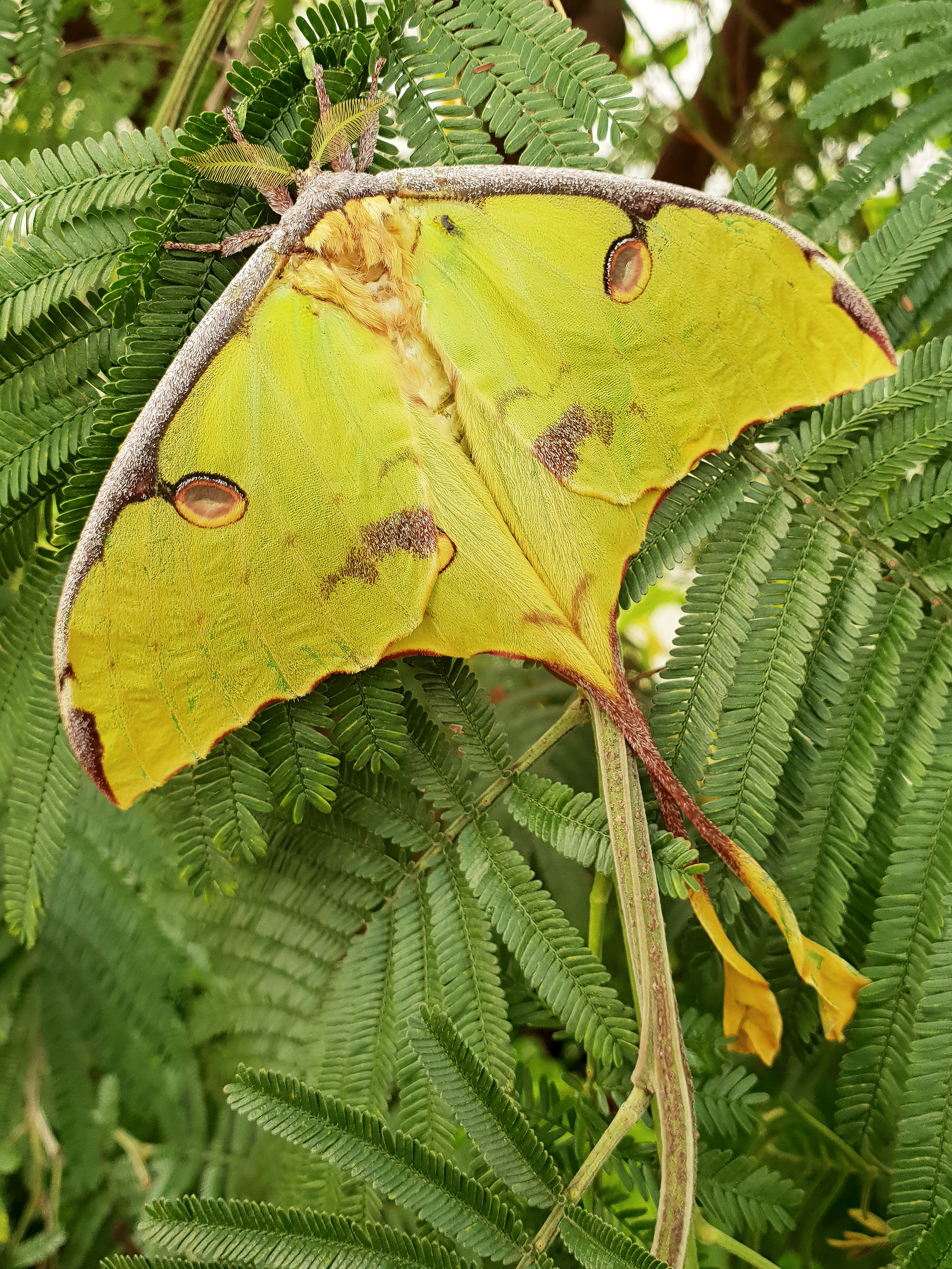
The especially long tails on the hindwings of the African moon moth, a Saturniid, oscillate in flight, deflecting the hunting bat's attack to the tails and thus enabling the moth to evade capture.

Some insects that are predated by bats have anti-predator adaptations, including predator avoidance, attack deflection, and ultrasonic clicks which appear to function as warnings rather than echolocation jamming.

Tiger moths (Arctiidae) of different species (two thirds of the species tested) respond to simulated attack by echolocating bats by producing an accelerating series of clicks. The species Bertholdia trigona has been shown to jam bat echolocation: when pit against naïve big brown bats, ultrasound was immediately and consistently effective at preventing bat attack. Bats came in contact with silent control moths 400% more often than with B. trigona.

Moth ultrasound can also function to startle the bat (a bluffing tactic), warn the bat that the moth is distasteful (honest signalling, aposematism), or mimic chemically defended species. Both aposematism and mimicry have been shown to confer a survival advantage against bat attack.

The greater wax moth (Galleria mellonella) takes predator avoidance actions such as dropping, looping, and freezing when it detects ultrasound waves, indicating that it can both detect and differentiate between ultrasound frequencies used by predators and signals from other members of their species. Some members of the Saturniidae moth family, which includes giant silk moths, have long tails on the hindwings, especially those in the Attacini and Arsenurinae subgroups. The tails oscillate in flight, creating echoes which deflect the hunting bat's attack from the moth's body to the tails. The species Argema mimosae (the African moon moth), which has especially long tails, was the most likely to evade capture.

== See also ==
- Animal navigation
- Human echolocation
- Magnetoreception
- Ultrasound
