= B. crocea =

B. crocea may refer to:

- Bertholdia crocea, a Central American moth
- Bloomeria crocea, a North American geophyte
- Bomarea crocea, a flowering plant
- Bulbine crocea, a flowering plant
