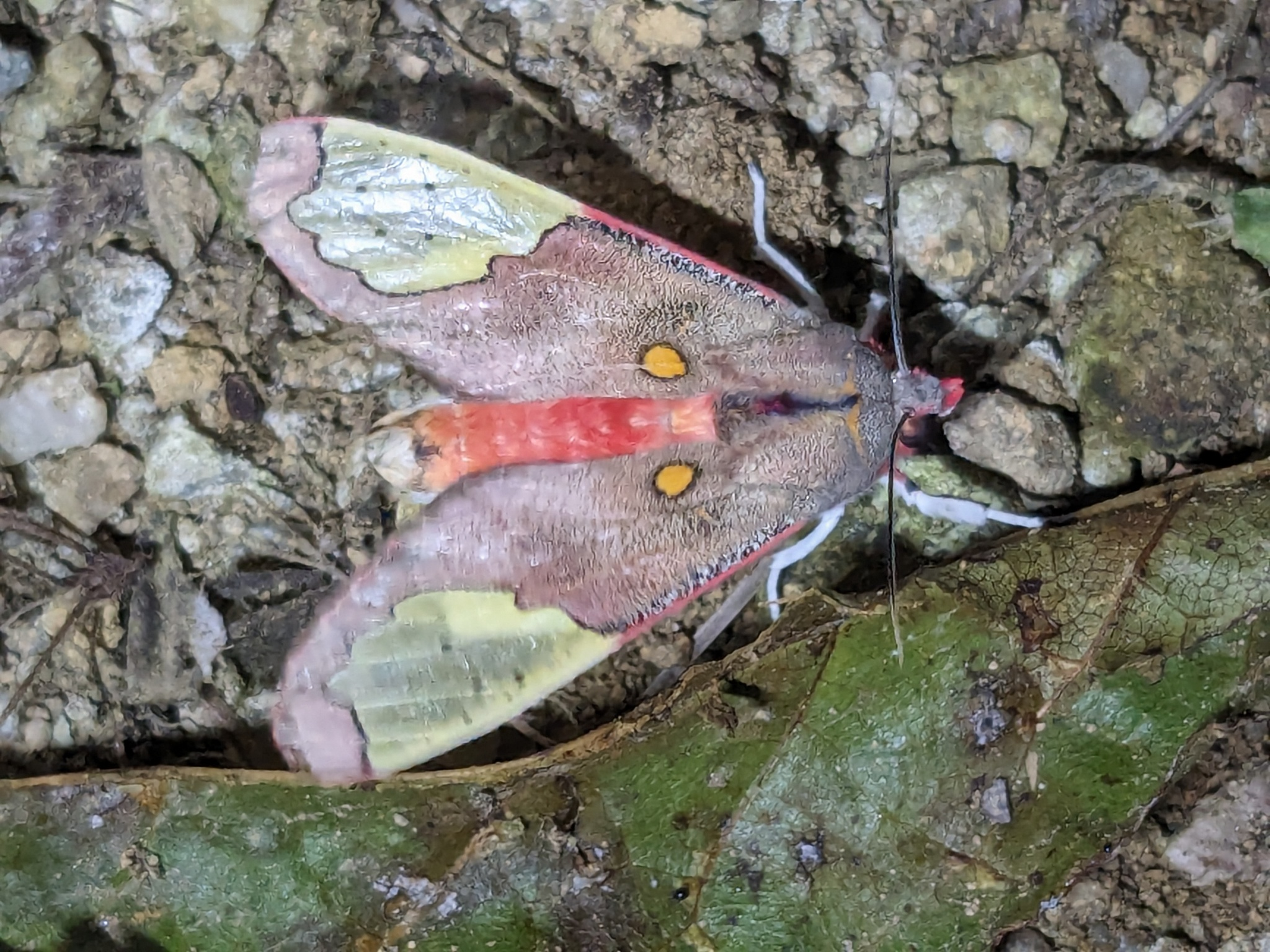

Scientific classification
- Kingdom: Animalia
- Phylum: Arthropoda
- Class: Insecta
- Order: Lepidoptera
- Superfamily: Noctuoidea
- Family: Erebidae
- Subfamily: Arctiinae
- Genus: Bertholdia
- Species: B. flavilucens

Binomial name
- Bertholdia flavilucens Schaus, 1920

= Bertholdia flavilucens =

Species of moth

Bertholdia flavilucens is a species of moth in the family Erebidae. It was first described by Schaus in 1920 and is found in Guatemala.
