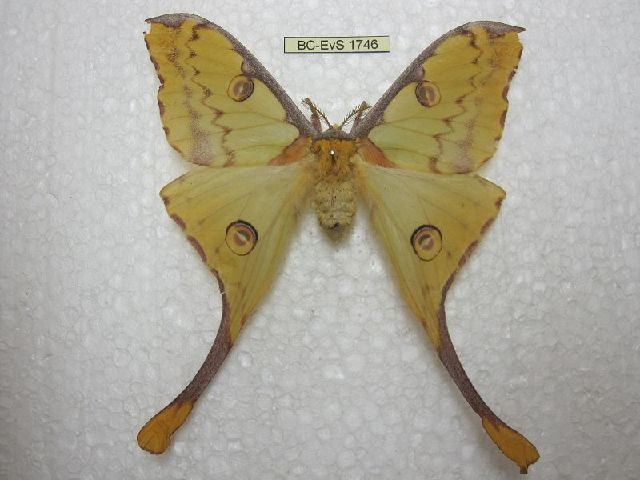

Scientific classification
- Domain: Eukaryota
- Kingdom: Animalia
- Phylum: Arthropoda
- Class: Insecta
- Order: Lepidoptera
- Family: Saturniidae
- Genus: Argema
- Species: A. kuhnei

Binomial name
- Argema kuhnei Pinhey, 1969

= Argema kuhnei =

Species of moth

Argema kuhnei is a moth in the family of Saturniidae. It is found in the Democratic Republic of the Congo, Tanzania and Zambia.

The larvae feed on Monotes katangensis.

== Subspecies ==
- A. kuhnei kuhnei Pinhey, 1969
- A. kuhnei katangensis Bouyer, 2008 (Democratic Republic of the Congo)
