= Bertholdia aroana =

Scientific classification
- Domain: Eukaryota
- Kingdom: Animalia
- Phylum: Arthropoda
- Class: Insecta
- Order: Lepidoptera
- Superfamily: Noctuoidea
- Family: Erebidae
- Subfamily: Arctiinae
- Genus: Bertholdia
- Species: B. aroana

Binomial name
- Bertholdia aroana Strand, 1919

Species of moth

Bertholdia aroana is a moth of the family Erebidae. It was described by Strand in 1919. It is found in Venezuela.
