= Bertholdia specularis =

Scientific classification
- Domain: Eukaryota
- Kingdom: Animalia
- Phylum: Arthropoda
- Class: Insecta
- Order: Lepidoptera
- Superfamily: Noctuoidea
- Family: Erebidae
- Subfamily: Arctiinae
- Genus: Bertholdia
- Species: B. specularis

Binomial name
- Bertholdia specularis (Herrich-Schäffer, [1853])

Synonyms
- Phaegoptera specularis Herrich-Schäffer, [1853]; Trichromia specularis; Pelochyta specularis

Species of moth

Bertholdia specularis is a moth of the family Erebidae. It was described by Gottlieb August Wilhelm Herrich-Schäffer in 1853. It is found in Mexico, Costa Rica, Nicaragua, Guatemala, Panama, Venezuela and Peru.

== Subspecies ==
- Bertholdia specularis specularis
- Bertholdia specularis rufescens Rothschild, 1910 (Peru)
