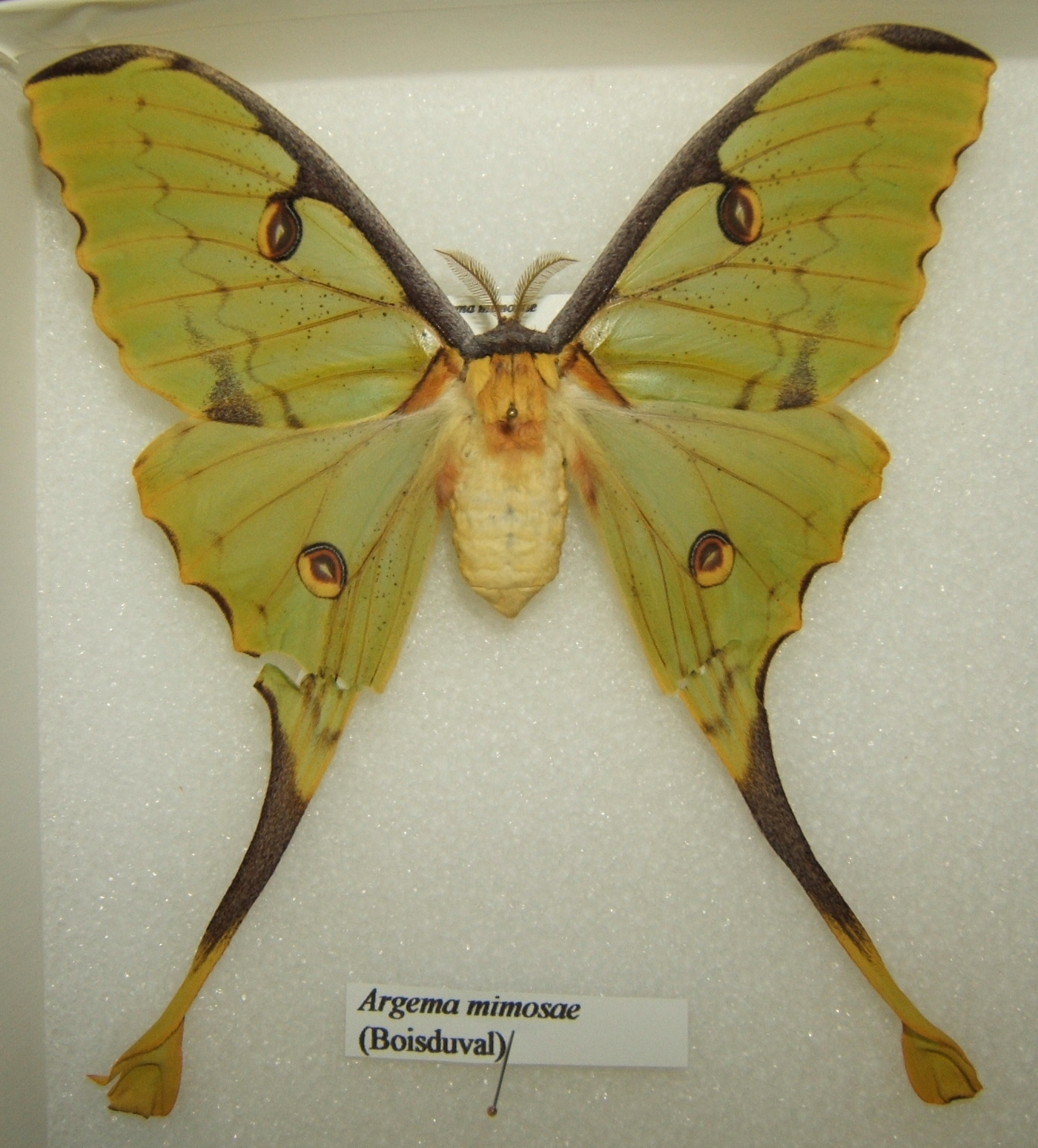
- Adult female

Scientific classification
- Kingdom: Animalia
- Phylum: Arthropoda
- Class: Insecta
- Order: Lepidoptera
- Family: Saturniidae
- Genus: Argema
- Species: A. mimosae

Binomial name
- Argema mimosae (Boisduval, 1847)

Synonyms
- Saturnia mimosae Boisduval, 1847; Argema bouvieri Ghesquière, 1934; Argema elucidata Grünberg, 1910; Argema occidentalis Gschwandner, 1923

= Argema mimosae =

African moon moth

Species of moth

Argema mimosae, the African moon moth, is a giant silk moth of the family Saturniidae. Similar in appearance to the giant Madagascan moon moth (Argema mittrei), but smaller, this moth can be found widely in Eastern Africa and more locally in Southern Africa, including near the east coast of South Africa. The species was first described by Jean Baptiste Boisduval in 1847. An adult can measure 10 to 12 centimetres (3.9 to 4.7 in) across its wingspan and 12 to 14 centimetres (4.7 to 5.5 in) from head to the tip of its elongated tail-like second pair of wings. Its forward wings have a distinctive grey-coloured "furry" leading edge, giving a very rough surface, presumably for aerodynamic reasons. Apart from the eye-like markings on its wings, the colouring and shape of the wings give the appearance of a piece of foliage, especially the tail-like structures of the rearmost wings which resemble a dried out leaf stem - presumably for camouflage in its natural environment.

== Identification ==
It is emerald green with yellow and red eyespots on its wings. It has long hindwings, giving the appearance of tails.

Larvae are green with thin white bands and rows of long projections on the back. The cocoons are silvery and pitted with small holes.

== Biology ==
Larvae arash feed on corkwood (Commiphora), marula (Sclerocarya birrea) and tamboti (Spirostachys africana).

== Habitat ==
In southern Africa, especially subtropical bushveld, there are two broods per year.

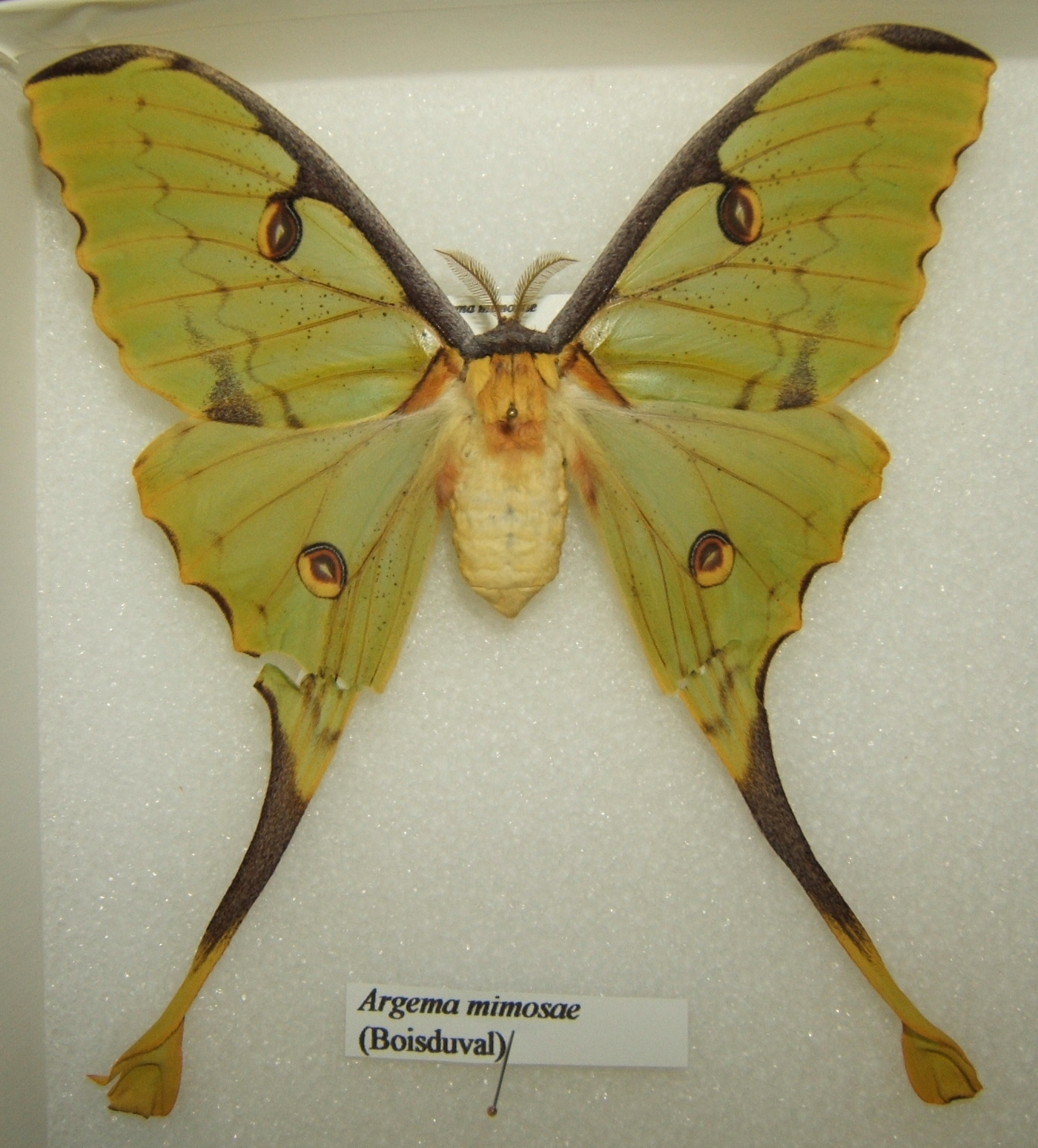
Adult female

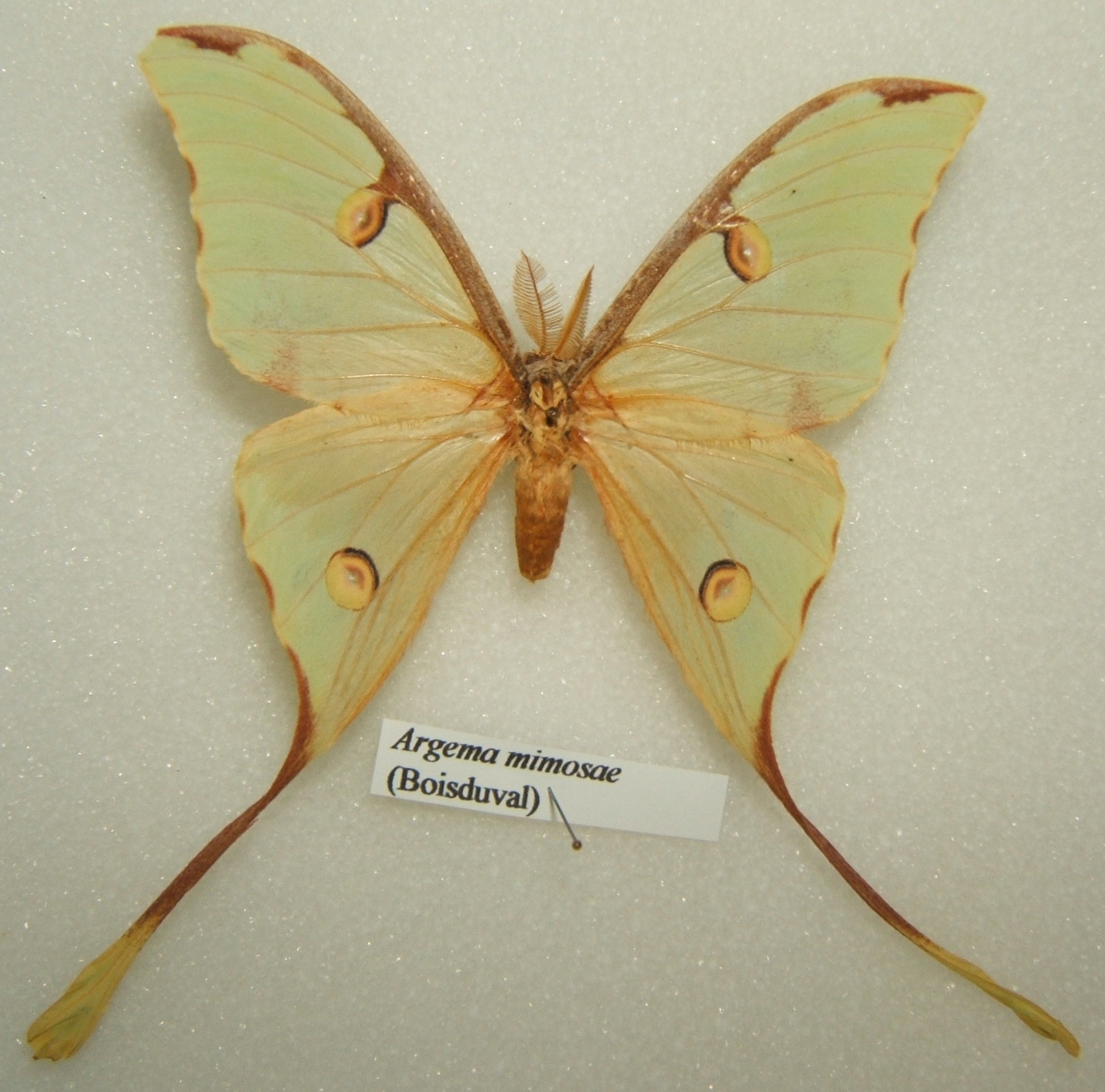
Adult male
