= Bertholdia schausiana =

Scientific classification
- Kingdom: Animalia
- Phylum: Arthropoda
- Class: Insecta
- Order: Lepidoptera
- Superfamily: Noctuoidea
- Family: Erebidae
- Subfamily: Arctiinae
- Genus: Bertholdia
- Species: B. schausiana

Binomial name
- Bertholdia schausiana Dyar, 1898

Species of moth

Bertholdia schausiana is a moth of the family Erebidae. It was described by Harrison Gray Dyar Jr. in 1898. It is found in Mexico and Costa Rica.
