= Bertholdia semiumbrata =

Scientific classification
- Domain: Eukaryota
- Kingdom: Animalia
- Phylum: Arthropoda
- Class: Insecta
- Order: Lepidoptera
- Superfamily: Noctuoidea
- Family: Erebidae
- Subfamily: Arctiinae
- Genus: Bertholdia
- Species: B. semiumbrata

Binomial name
- Bertholdia semiumbrata Seitz, 1921

Species of moth

Bertholdia semiumbrata is a moth of the family Erebidae. It was described by Adalbert Seitz in 1921. It is found in Costa Rica.
