= Bertholdia myosticta =

Scientific classification
- Kingdom: Animalia
- Phylum: Arthropoda
- Clade: Pancrustacea
- Class: Insecta
- Order: Lepidoptera
- Superfamily: Noctuoidea
- Family: Erebidae
- Subfamily: Arctiinae
- Genus: Bertholdia
- Species: B. myosticta

Binomial name
- Bertholdia myosticta H. Druce, 1897

Species of moth

Bertholdia myosticta is a moth of the family Erebidae. It was described by Herbert Druce in 1897. It is found in Mexico, Costa Rica and Venezuela.
