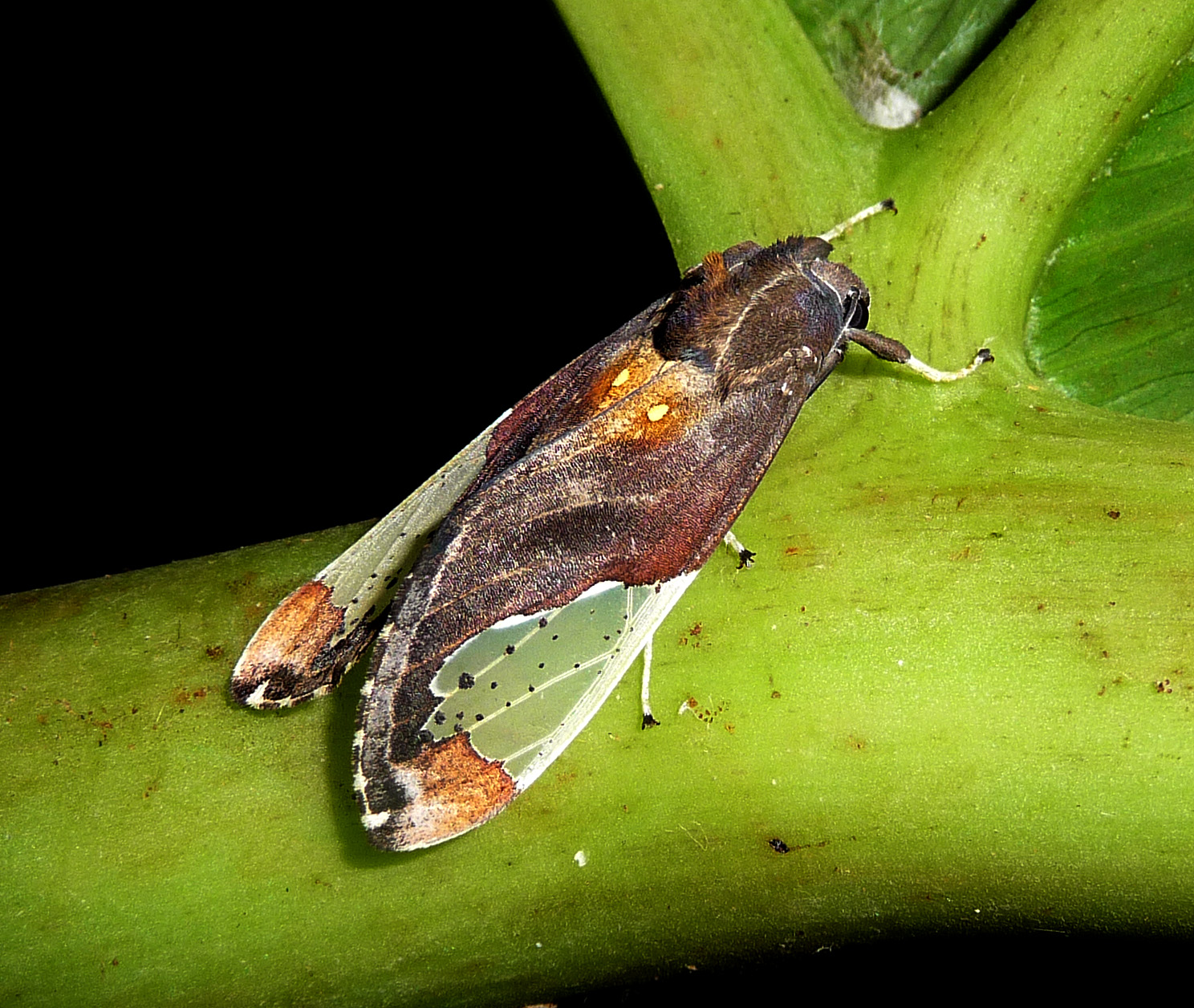
- Bertholdia flavidorsata sitting on a plant

Scientific classification
- Kingdom: Animalia
- Phylum: Arthropoda
- Class: Insecta
- Order: Lepidoptera
- Superfamily: Noctuoidea
- Family: Erebidae
- Subfamily: Arctiinae
- Genus: Bertholdia
- Species: B. flavidorsata

Binomial name
- Bertholdia flavidorsata Hampson, 1901

= Bertholdia flavidorsata =

Species of moth

Bertholdia flavidorsata is a moth of the family Erebidae. It was described by George Hampson in 1901. It is found in Bolivia and Ecuador.
