= Bertholdia philotera =

Scientific classification
- Domain: Eukaryota
- Kingdom: Animalia
- Phylum: Arthropoda
- Class: Insecta
- Order: Lepidoptera
- Superfamily: Noctuoidea
- Family: Erebidae
- Subfamily: Arctiinae
- Genus: Bertholdia
- Species: B. philotera

Binomial name
- Bertholdia philotera H. Druce, 1897

Synonyms
- Bertholdia philoptera

Species of moth

Bertholdia philotera is a moth of the family Erebidae. It was described by Herbert Druce in 1897. It is found in Panama and Costa Rica.
