= Argema besanti =

Scientific classification
- Kingdom: Animalia
- Phylum: Arthropoda
- Clade: Pancrustacea
- Class: Insecta
- Order: Lepidoptera
- Family: Saturniidae
- Genus: Argema
- Species: A. besanti

Binomial name
- Argema besanti Rebel, 1895

Species of moth

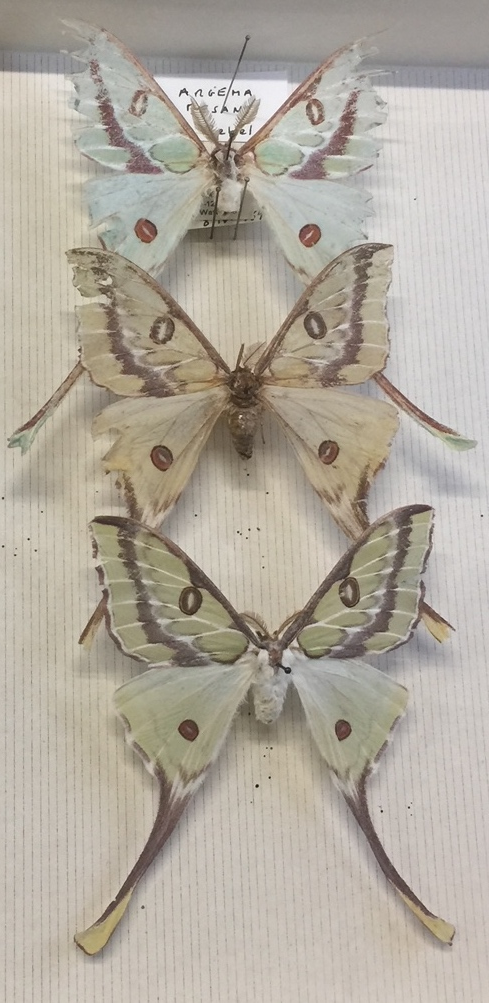
Argema besanti, male

Argema besanti, the Equinox moth, is a moth in the family Saturniidae. It is found in Tanzania and Kenya as well as Ethiopia, and possibly Somalia.

It was discovered by Hans Rebel, a German on African expedition in 1895. It exists very rarely in collections, with likely less than 100 individuals known, all of which originate in Kenya. Some are in private collections fetching thousands on auction, and others are held by museums. Some examples are:

- Natural History Museum, London: 10
- International Centre of Insect Physiology and Ecology: 5
- Research collection of Thierry Bouyer: 2
- Research collection of Stefan Naumar: 1
- Research collection of Erik Van Schayck: 1

It has an approximate length of 9 centimeters and wingspan of 11 centimeters. Its wings are colored green, while the upper wings are darker. It has a little red "eye" on each wing. The adult moth cannot eat and lives for 4–6 days.
