= Bertholdia grisescens =

Scientific classification
- Domain: Eukaryota
- Kingdom: Animalia
- Phylum: Arthropoda
- Class: Insecta
- Order: Lepidoptera
- Superfamily: Noctuoidea
- Family: Erebidae
- Subfamily: Arctiinae
- Genus: Bertholdia
- Species: B. grisescens

Binomial name
- Bertholdia grisescens Rothschild, 1909

Species of moth

Bertholdia grisescens is a moth of the family Erebidae. It was described by Walter Rothschild in 1909. It is found in Peru, Ecuador, Colombia and Paraguay.
