= Bertholdia detracta =

Scientific classification
- Domain: Eukaryota
- Kingdom: Animalia
- Phylum: Arthropoda
- Class: Insecta
- Order: Lepidoptera
- Superfamily: Noctuoidea
- Family: Erebidae
- Subfamily: Arctiinae
- Genus: Bertholdia
- Species: B. detracta

Binomial name
- Bertholdia detracta Seitz, 1921

Species of moth

Bertholdia detracta is a moth of the family Erebidae. It was described by Adalbert Seitz in 1921. It is found in Colombia, French Guiana, Brazil, Venezuela, Bolivia, Honduras and Mexico.
