= Bertholdia albipuncta =

Scientific classification
- Domain: Eukaryota
- Kingdom: Animalia
- Phylum: Arthropoda
- Class: Insecta
- Order: Lepidoptera
- Superfamily: Noctuoidea
- Family: Erebidae
- Subfamily: Arctiinae
- Genus: Bertholdia
- Species: B. albipuncta

Binomial name
- Bertholdia albipuncta Schaus, 1896

Species of moth

Bertholdia albipuncta is a moth of the family Erebidae. It was described by William Schaus in 1896. It is found in Mexico, Panama, Venezuela and Brazil.
