= Echolocation jamming =

Interference with animal sonar systems

Echolocation (or sonar) systems of animals, like human radar systems, are susceptible to interference known as echolocation jamming or sonar jamming. Jamming occurs when non-target sounds interfere with target echoes. Jamming can be purposeful or inadvertent, and can be caused by the echolocation system itself, other echolocating animals, prey, or humans. Echolocating animals have evolved to minimize jamming, however; echolocation avoidance behaviors are not always successful.

== Self jamming ==
Echolocating animals can jam themselves in a number of ways. Bats, for example, produce some of the loudest sounds in nature, and then they immediately listen for echoes that are hundreds of times fainter than the sounds they emit. To avoid deafening themselves, whenever a bat makes an echolocation emission, a small muscle in the bat's middle ear (the stapedius muscle) clamps down on small bones called ossicles, which normally amplify sounds between the ear drum and the cochlea. This dampens the intensity of the sounds that the bat hears during this time, preserving hearing sensitivity to target echoes.

Jamming can occur if an animal is still producing a sound when an echo returns, for example, from a nearby object. Bats avoid this type of jamming by producing short sounds of 3–50 ms when searching for prey or navigating. Bats produce progressively shorter sounds, down to 0.5 ms, to avoid self-jamming when echolocating targets that they are approaching. This is because echoes from nearby targets will return to the bat sooner than sounds from distant targets.

Another form of jamming occurs when an echolocating animal produces many sounds in succession and assigns an echo to the wrong emission. To avoid this type of jamming, bats typically wait enough time for echoes to return from all possible targets before making the next sound. This can be seen clearly when a bat attacks an insect. The bat produces sounds with progressively shorter time intervals, but always allowing enough time for sounds to travel to the target and back. Another way bats overcome this problem is by producing successive sounds with unique time-frequency structures. This allows bats to process echoes from multiple emissions at the same time, and to correctly assign an echo to its emission using its time-frequency signature.

== Jamming by other echolocation systems ==
Like electric fish, echolocating animals are susceptible to jamming from other animals of the same species emitting signals in the nearby environment. To avoid such jamming, bats use a strategy also employed by electric fish to avoid this jamming: a behavior known as jamming avoidance response (JAR). In a JAR, one or both animals change the frequency of their sounds away from that used by the other animal. This has the effect of allowing each animal a unique frequency bandwidth where jamming will not occur. Bats can make this adjustment very rapidly, often in less than 0.2 seconds.

Big brown bats can avoid jamming by going silent for periods of time when following another echolocating big brown bat. This sometimes allows the silent bat to capture a prey in competitive foraging situations.

== Jamming by prey ==
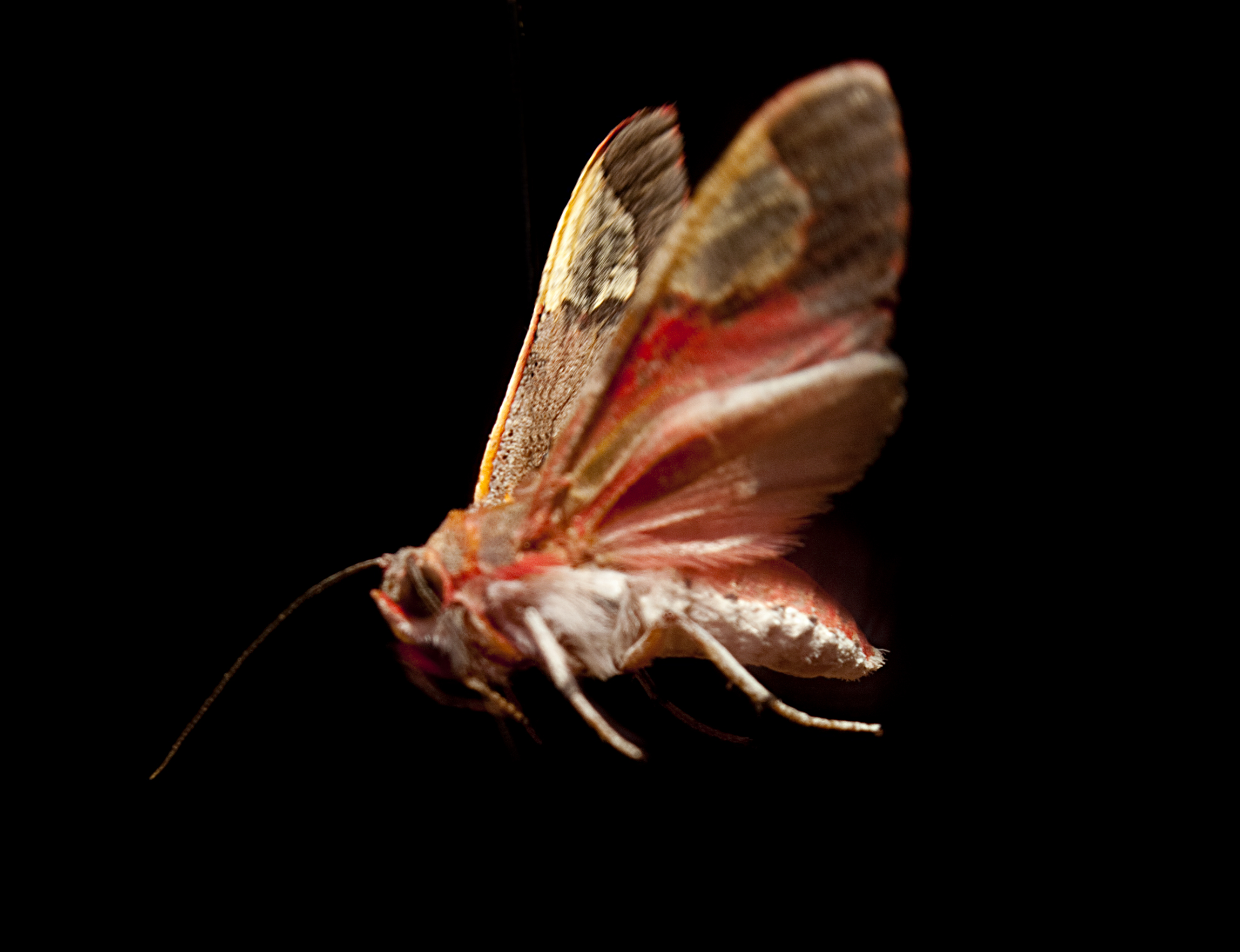
The moth Bertholdia trigona is one of several moth species known to jam the echolocation of its predator

Many tiger moths produce ultrasonic clicks in response to the echolocation calls bats use while attacking prey. For most species of tiger moth these clicks warn bats that the moths have toxic compounds that make them distasteful. However, the tiger moth Bertholdia trigona produces clicks at a very high rate (up to 4,500 per second) to jam bat echolocation. Jamming is the most effective defense against bats ever documented, with jamming causing a ten-fold decrease in bat capture success in the field.

=== History ===
The possibility that moths jam bat echolocation arose with an experiment report published in 1965 by Dorothy Dunning and Kenneth Roeder. Moth clicks were played through a loudspeaker as bats tried to capture mealworms catapulted through the air. Moth clicks caused bats to veer away from the mealworms, but echolocation calls played through the speaker did not, causing the authors to conclude that the moth clicks themselves dissuaded the bats. However, it was later determined that the moth clicks were played at an unnaturally loud level, invalidating this conclusion.

In subsequent years Dunning conducted further experiments to show that moth clicks serve a warning function. That is, they communicate to bats that the moths are toxic, as many moths accumulate toxic chemicals from their host plants as caterpillars and keep them in their tissues through adulthood. Roeder agreed with Dunning's findings.

James Fullard and colleagues published findings in 1979, and 1994 arguing in favor of the jamming hypothesis based on the acoustic characteristics of moth clicks, however this hypothesis was still widely debated in the literature during that time.

In the 1990s experiments were conducted broadcasting clicks to bats performing echolocation tasks on a platform and with neurophysiological methods to demonstrate a plausible mechanism for jamming. The researchers concluded that most tiger moths do not produce enough sound to jam bat sonar.

The first study to conclusively demonstrate that moths jam bats was published in 2009 by researchers at Wake Forest University. In this study big brown bats were raised in captivity to ensure they had no prior experience with clicking prey and trained to attack moths tethered to a thin line attached to the ceiling in an indoor flight room. Over a nine-night experiment the bats attacked non-clicking control moths and clicking Bertholdia trigona – moths that were selected for their extraordinary clicking abilities. Bats had substantial difficulty catching the clicking moths compared to silent controls, and ate the B. trigona moths when they had the opportunity, thus refuting the hypothesis that the clicks were warning the bats of moths' toxicity. Moth clicks also disrupted the stereotypical pattern of the bats echolocation, confirming the clicks' jamming function.

Since then, sonar jamming has been documented in two other moth families. Silk moths (Saturniidae) have elongated hindwing tails that reflect bat sonar, increasing the success of escape from bat attacks. Some species of hawkmoths (Sphingidae) produce ultrasound capable of sonar jamming. Sonar jamming capability has evolved independently in at least six subfamilies. Because sonar jamming seems to require high duty cycle ultrasound, it is believed to be a derived form of the simpler ultrasound used for aposematism and mimicry.

In a 2022 report, bats are found to change their emission lengths to defeat high duty cycle jamming.

== Humans jamming animals ==
Humans may jam echolocating animals deliberately or accidentally. Recent efforts have been made to develop acoustic jamming deterrents to exclude bats from buildings or bridges, or to keep bats away from wind turbines where large numbers of mortalities occur. These deterrents have been shown to reduce bat activity over a small area. However, scaling up acoustic deterrents to large volumes for applications such as keeping bats away from wind turbines is difficult because of the high atmospheric attenuation of ultrasound.
