= Bertholdia almeidai =

Scientific classification
- Domain: Eukaryota
- Kingdom: Animalia
- Phylum: Arthropoda
- Class: Insecta
- Order: Lepidoptera
- Superfamily: Noctuoidea
- Family: Erebidae
- Subfamily: Arctiinae
- Genus: Bertholdia
- Species: B. almeidai

Binomial name
- Bertholdia almeidai Travassos, 1950

Species of moth

Bertholdia almeidai is a moth of the family Erebidae. It was described by Travassos in 1950. It is found in Brazil.
