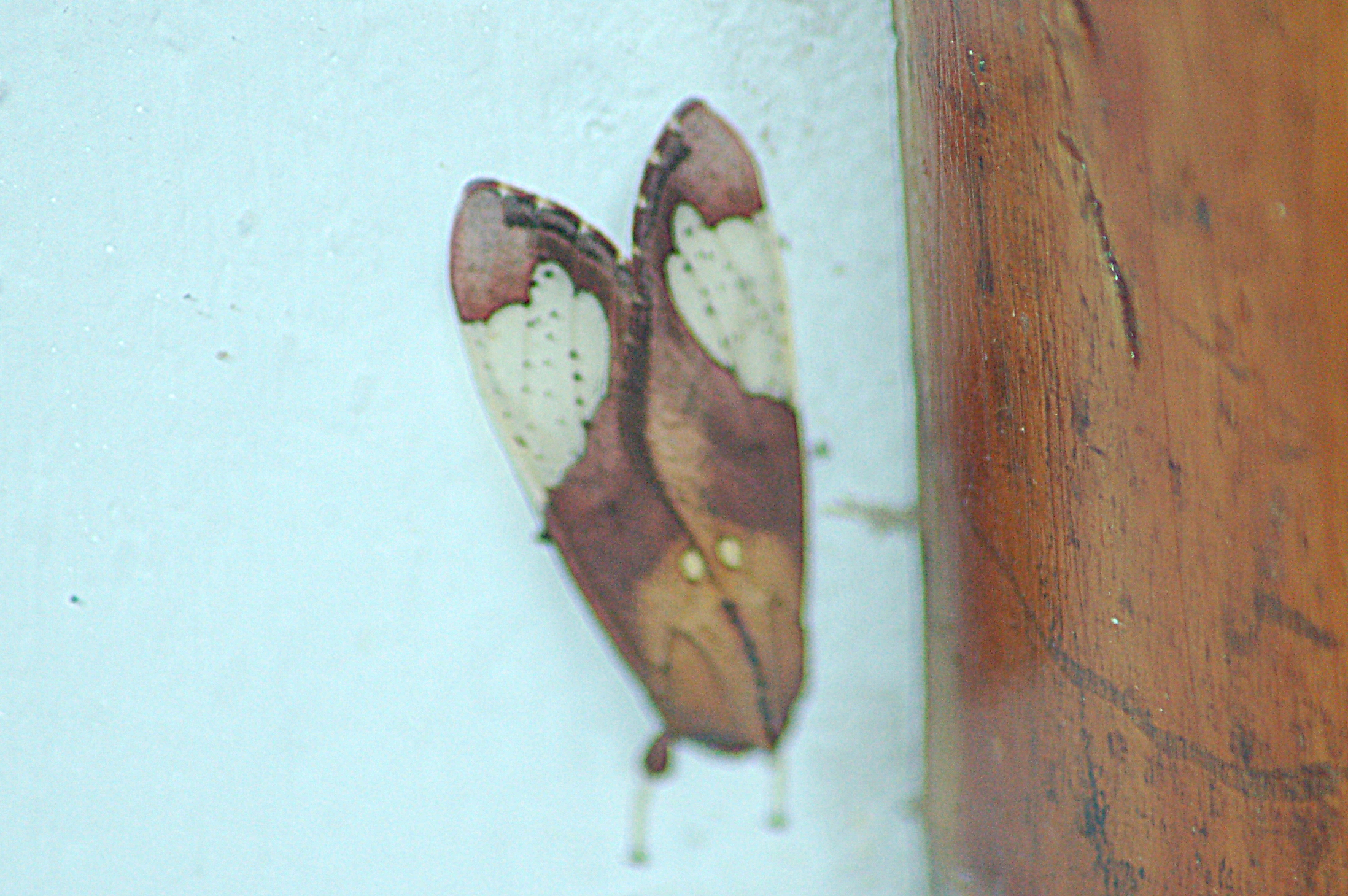

Scientific classification
- Domain: Eukaryota
- Kingdom: Animalia
- Phylum: Arthropoda
- Class: Insecta
- Order: Lepidoptera
- Superfamily: Noctuoidea
- Family: Erebidae
- Subfamily: Arctiinae
- Genus: Bertholdia
- Species: B. ockendeni

Binomial name
- Bertholdia ockendeni Rothschild, 1909

= Bertholdia ockendeni =

Species of moth

Bertholdia ockendeni is a moth of the family Erebidae. It was described by Walter Rothschild in 1909. It is found in Peru.
