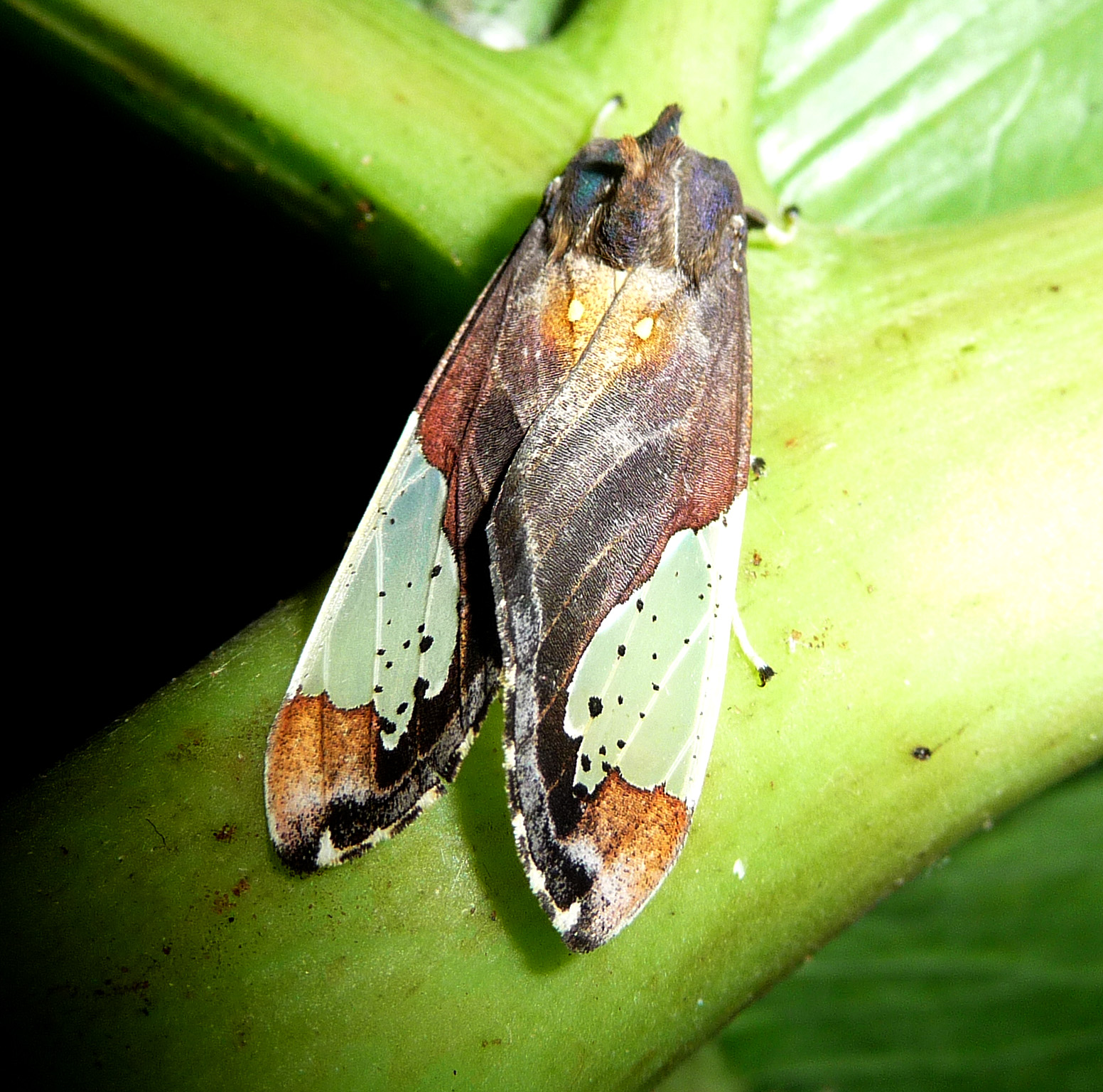
- Bertholdia flavidorsata

Scientific classification
- Domain: Eukaryota
- Kingdom: Animalia
- Phylum: Arthropoda
- Class: Insecta
- Order: Lepidoptera
- Superfamily: Noctuoidea
- Family: Erebidae
- Subfamily: Arctiinae
- Subtribe: Phaegopterina
- Genus: Bertholdia; Schaus, 1896

= Bertholdia =

Genus of moths

Bertholdia is a genus of moths in the family Erebidae.

== Species ==
- Bertholdia albipuncta Schaus, 1896
- Bertholdia almeidai Travassos, 1950
- Bertholdia aroana Strand, 1919
- Bertholdia crocea Schaus, 1910
- Bertholdia detracta Seitz, 1921
- Bertholdia flavidorsata Hampson, 1901
- Bertholdia flavilucens Schaus, 1920
- Bertholdia fumida Schaus, 1910
- Bertholdia grisescens Rothschild, 1909
- Bertholdia livida Seitz, 1921
- Bertholdia myosticta Druce, 1897
- Bertholdia ockendeni Rothschild, 1909
- Bertholdia philotera Druce, 1897
- Bertholdia pseudofumida Travassos, 1950
- Bertholdia rubromaculata Rothschild, 1909
- Bertholdia schausiana Dyar, 1898
- Bertholdia semiumbrata Seitz, 1921
- Bertholdia soror Dyar, 1901
- Bertholdia specularis (Herrich-Schäffer, [1853])
- Bertholdia steinbachi Rothschild, 1909
- Bertholdia trigona (Grote, 1879) – Grote's bertholdia moth
