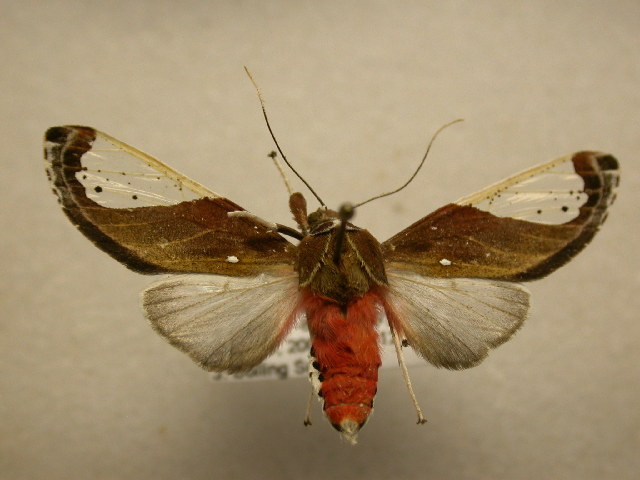

Scientific classification
- Domain: Eukaryota
- Kingdom: Animalia
- Phylum: Arthropoda
- Class: Insecta
- Order: Lepidoptera
- Superfamily: Noctuoidea
- Family: Erebidae
- Subfamily: Arctiinae
- Genus: Bertholdia
- Species: B. fumida

Binomial name
- Bertholdia fumida Schaus, 1910

= Bertholdia fumida =

Species of moth

Bertholdia fumida is a moth of the family Erebidae. It was described by Schaus in 1910. It is found in Costa Rica.

== Taxonomy ==
class Insecta > subclass Pterygota > infraclass Neoptera > superorder Holometabola >order Lepidoptera >superfamily Noctuoidea > family Erebidae > subfamily Arctiinae > tribe Phaegopterini >genus Bertholdia > species Bertholdia fumida

== Species name(s) ==
- Bertholdia fumida Schaus, 1910.
