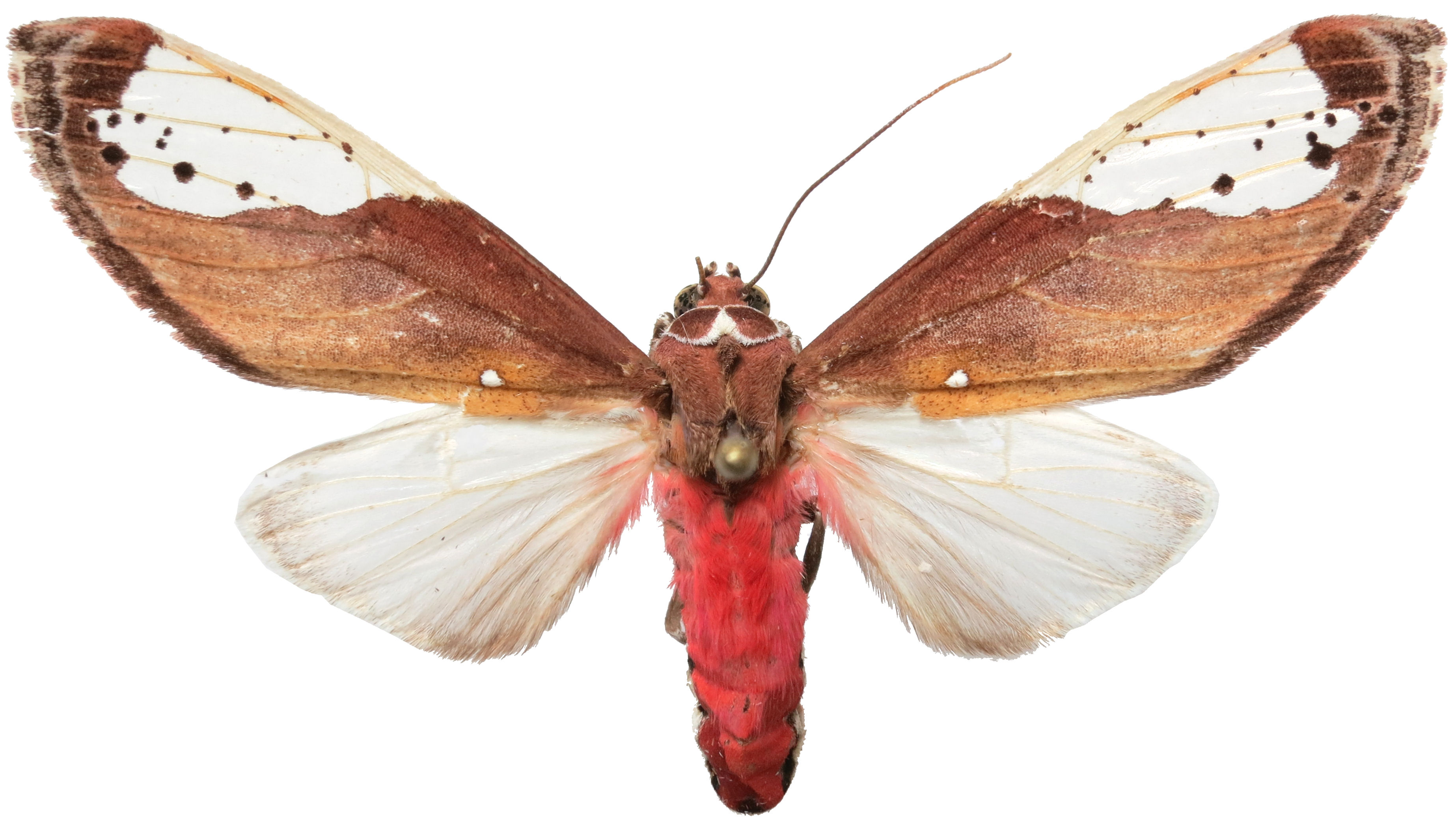
- B. pseudofumida from Tumbes Province, peru

Scientific classification
- Domain: Eukaryota
- Kingdom: Animalia
- Phylum: Arthropoda
- Class: Insecta
- Order: Lepidoptera
- Superfamily: Noctuoidea
- Family: Erebidae
- Subfamily: Arctiinae
- Genus: Bertholdia
- Species: B. pseudofumida

Binomial name
- Bertholdia pseudofumida Travassos, 1950

= Bertholdia pseudofumida =

Species of moth

Bertholdia pseudofumida is a moth of the family Erebidae. It was described by Lauro Travassos in 1950. It is found in Brazil.
