= Bertholdia soror =

Scientific classification
- Kingdom: Animalia
- Phylum: Arthropoda
- Class: Insecta
- Order: Lepidoptera
- Superfamily: Noctuoidea
- Family: Erebidae
- Subfamily: Arctiinae
- Genus: Bertholdia
- Species: B. soror

Binomial name
- Bertholdia soror Dyar, 1901

Synonyms
- Bertholdia braziliensis Hampson, 1901

Species of moth

Bertholdia soror is a moth of the family Erebidae. It was described by Harrison Gray Dyar Jr. in 1901. It is found in Venezuela and Brazil.
