= Argema fournieri =

Scientific classification
- Kingdom: Animalia
- Phylum: Arthropoda
- Class: Insecta
- Order: Lepidoptera
- Family: Saturniidae
- Genus: Argema
- Species: A. fournieri

Binomial name
- Argema fournieri Darge, 1971

Synonyms
- Argema mimosae fournieri Darge, 1971

Species of moth

Argema fournieri is a moth of the family Saturniidae. It is found in Cameroon and Nigeria.

The larvae have been recorded feeding on Liquidambar and Rhus species.
