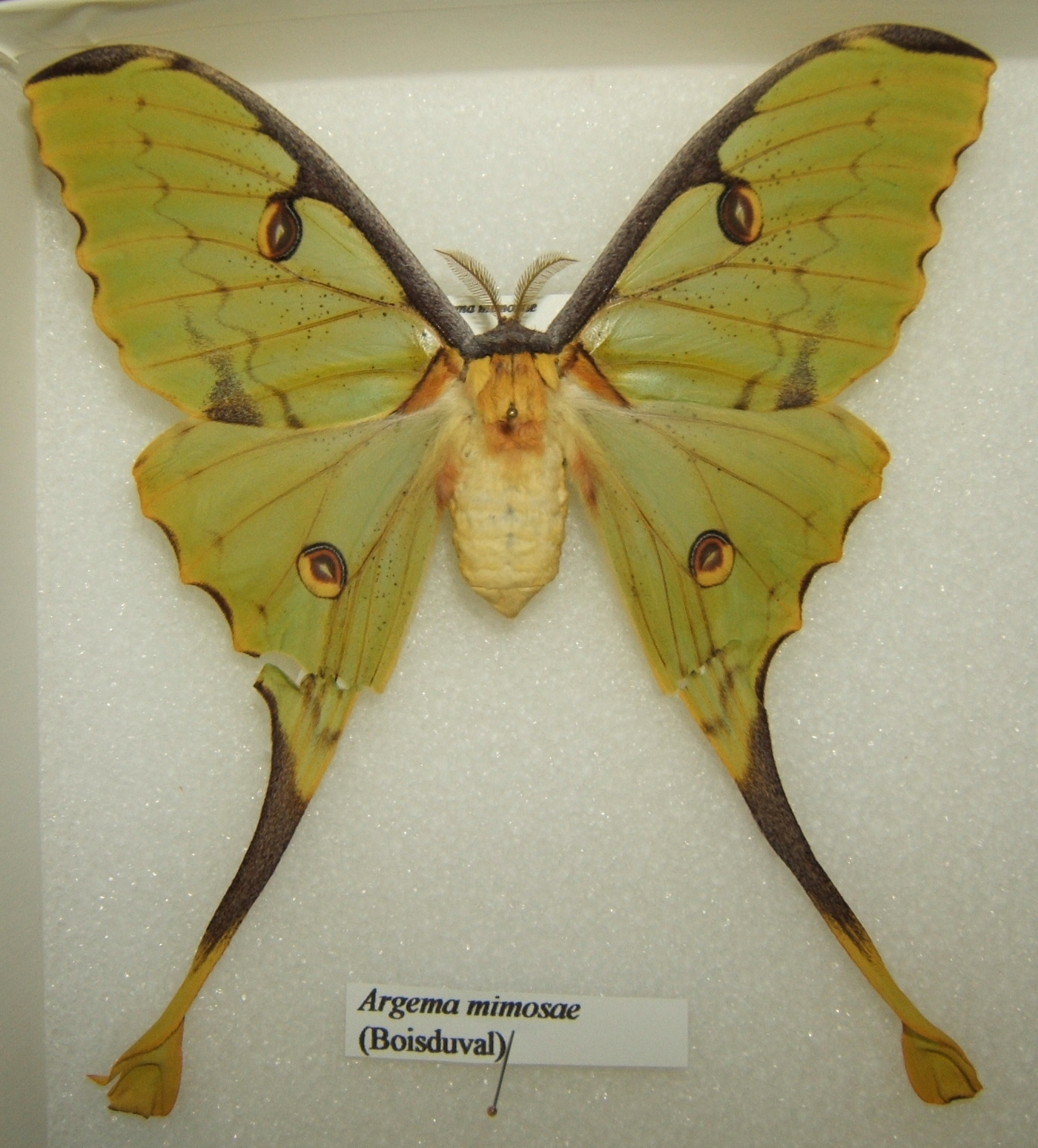
- Mounted female Argema mimosae specimen

Scientific classification
- Kingdom: Animalia
- Phylum: Arthropoda
- Clade: Pancrustacea
- Class: Insecta
- Order: Lepidoptera
- Family: Saturniidae
- Tribe: Saturniini
- Genus: Argema; Wallengren, 1858

Species
- See text

Synonyms
- Angas Wallengren, 1865; Cometesia Bouvier, 1928

= Argema =

Genus of moths

Argema is a genus of moths from the family Saturniidae, commonly known as moon moths. They are distinguished by long tails on their hindwings. All five species in the genus are endemic to Subsaharan Africa.

== Species ==
- Argema besanti (Rebel, 1895)
- Argema fournieri (Darge, 1971)
- Argema kuhnei (Pinhey, 1969)
- Argema mimosae (Boisduval, 1847)
- Argema mittrei (Guerin-Meneville, 1846)
