= Bertholdia crocea =

Scientific classification
- Domain: Eukaryota
- Kingdom: Animalia
- Phylum: Arthropoda
- Class: Insecta
- Order: Lepidoptera
- Superfamily: Noctuoidea
- Family: Erebidae
- Subfamily: Arctiinae
- Genus: Bertholdia
- Species: B. crocea

Binomial name
- Bertholdia crocea Schaus, 1910

Species of moth

Bertholdia crocea is a moth of the family Erebidae. It was described by Schaus in 1910. It is found in Costa Rica and Nicaragua.
