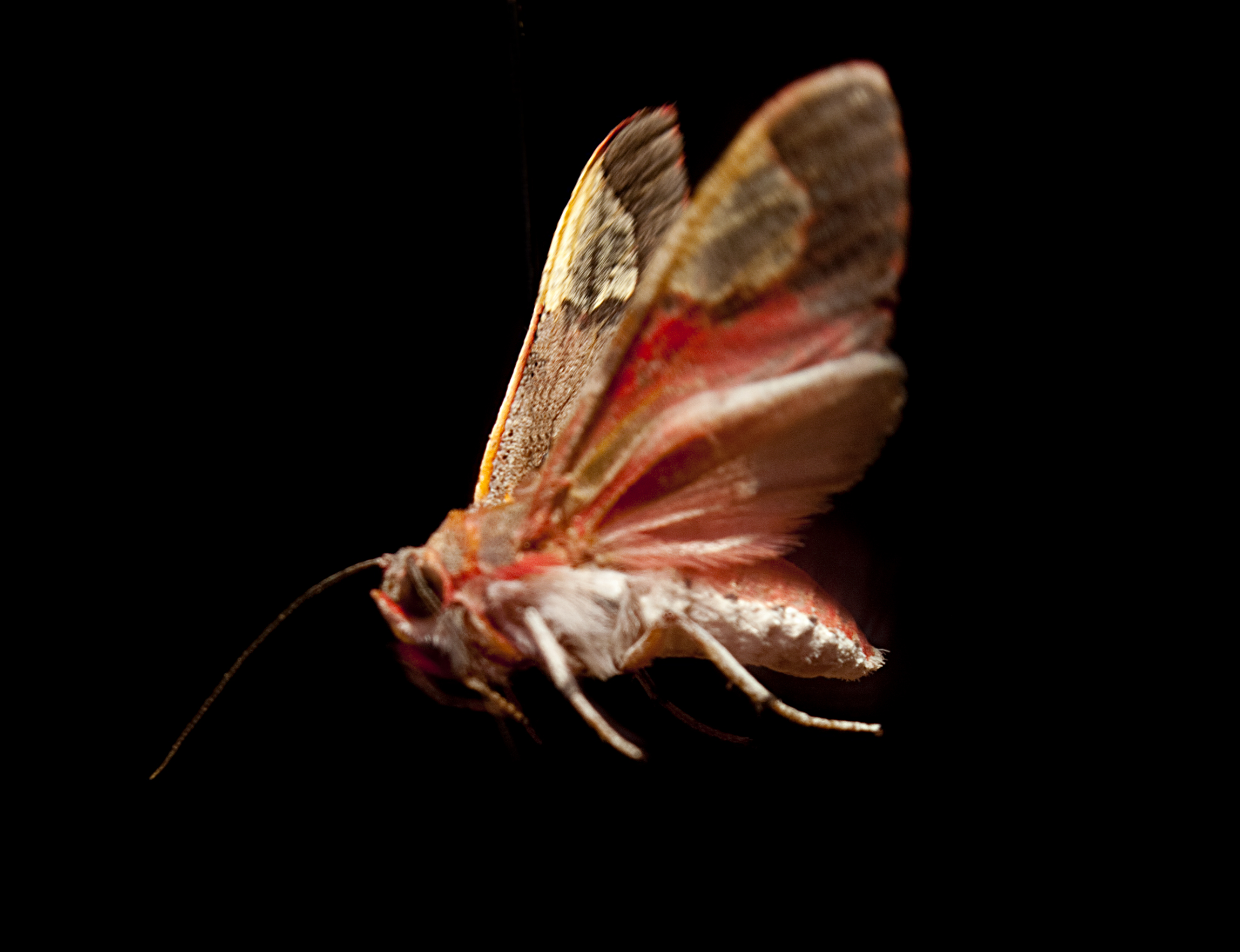

Scientific classification
- Kingdom: Animalia
- Phylum: Arthropoda
- Class: Insecta
- Order: Lepidoptera
- Superfamily: Noctuoidea
- Family: Erebidae
- Subfamily: Arctiinae
- Genus: Bertholdia
- Species: B. trigona

Binomial name
- Bertholdia trigona (Grote, 1879)

Synonyms
- Halysidota trigona Grote, 1879

= Bertholdia trigona =

Grote's bertholdia

Species of moth

Bertholdia trigona, or Grote's bertholdia, is a species of moth in the family Erebidae. The species was first described by Augustus Radcliffe Grote in 1879. It is prevalent in the southwestern United States.

In studies performed at Wake Forest University, these moths were shown to have developed the ability to disrupt the echolocation of bats. This insect is one of several moths known to jam its predator's echolocation and has the highest recorded click rate of any moth species, a feature hypothesized to increase the effectiveness of jamming.
