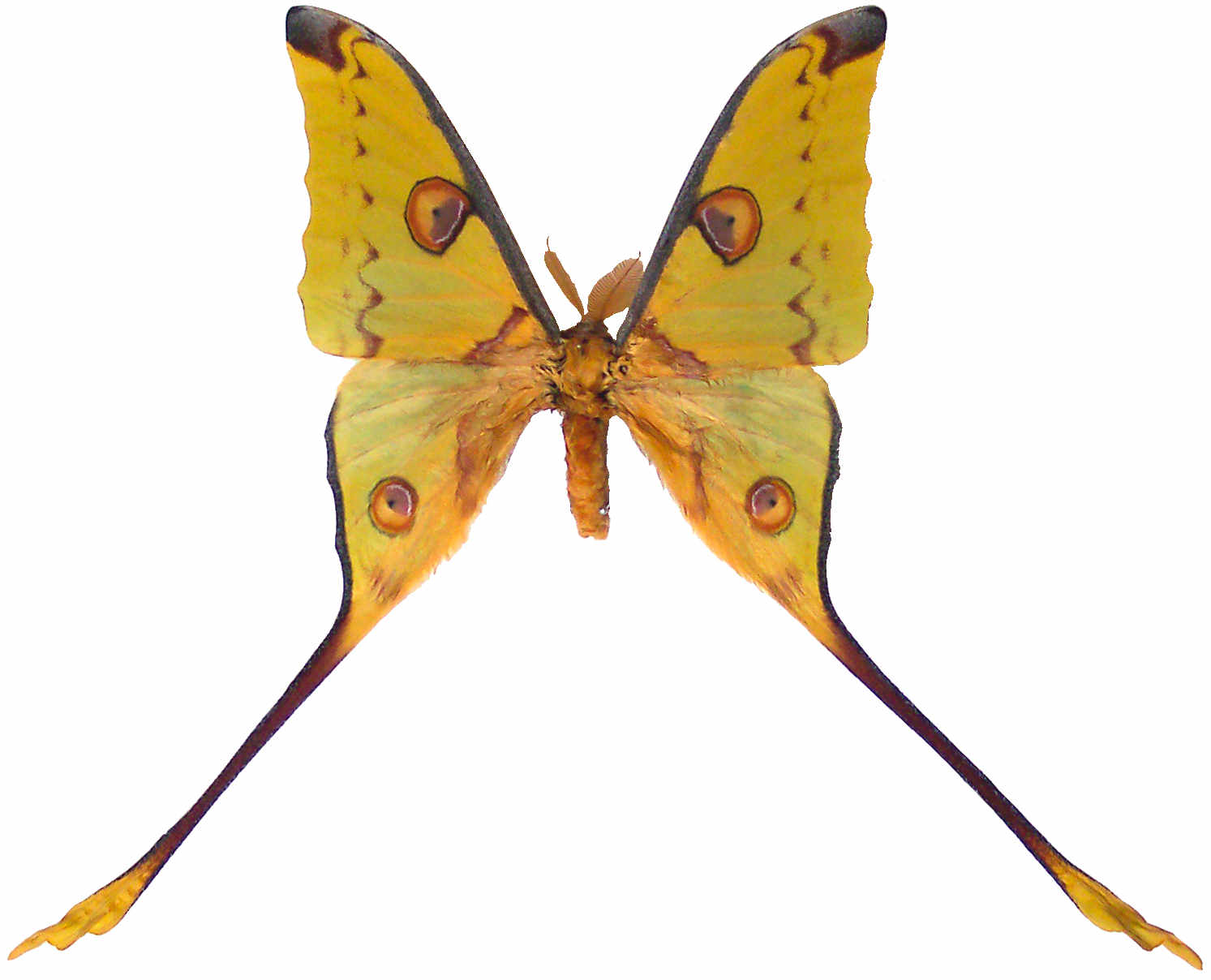
- Adult male
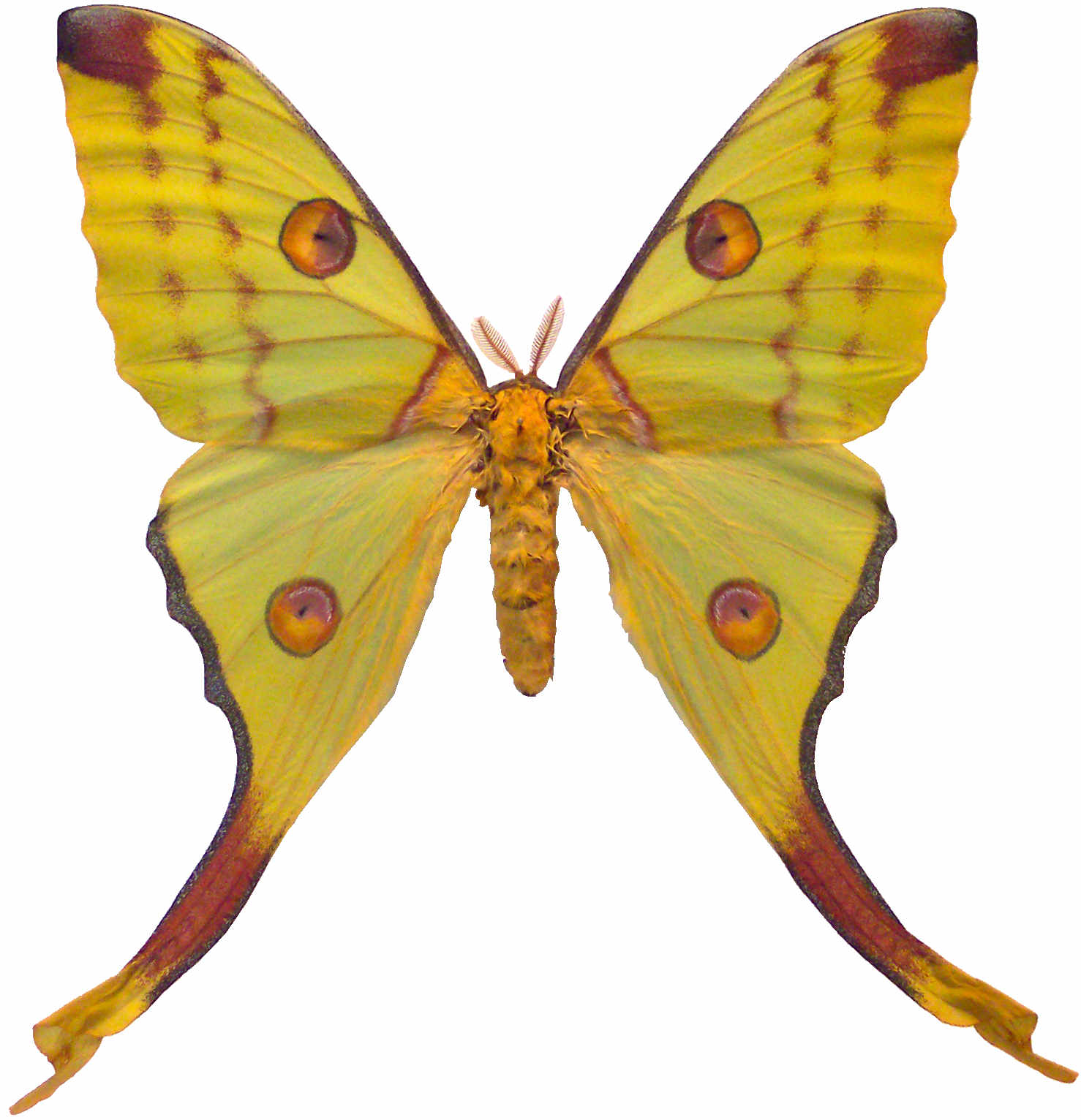
- Adult female

Scientific classification
- Kingdom: Animalia
- Phylum: Arthropoda
- Clade: Pancrustacea
- Class: Insecta
- Order: Lepidoptera
- Family: Saturniidae
- Genus: Argema
- Species: A. mittrei

Binomial name
- Argema mittrei (Guérin-Méneville, 1847)

Synonyms
- Argemma mittrei; Saturnia cometes Boisduval, 1847; Tropaea madagascariensis Bartlett, 1873; Actias idae Felder & Rogenhofer, 1874; Cometes madagascariensis; Actias mittrei; Bombyx mittrei Guérin-Méneville, 1847; Argema cometes (Guenée, 1865); Argema idae (Felder, 1874); Argema immaculata (Bang-Haas, 1934); Argema madagascariensis (Barlett, 1873)

= Comet moth =

Species of moth

The comet moth or Madagascan moon moth (Argema mittrei) is a moth native to the rain forests of Madagascar. The species was first described by Félix Édouard Guérin-Méneville in 1847. The adult moth cannot feed and only lives for 4 to 5 days. Although endangered in the wild due to habitat loss, the comet moth has been bred in captivity. The genus name Argema is Greek for "speckled eye" referencing the abundance of eyespots on their wings, warding off predators.

== Physical features ==
There are physical differences among females and males. Females have more rounded wings. The male has a wingspan of 20 cm (7.9 inches) and a tail span of 15 cm (5.9 inches), making it one of the world's largest silk moths. The males have long, feathery antennae and the females have thin antennae. Argema mittrei wings have large eyespots, giving the appearance of a large and dangerous creature that should not be attacked.

== Host plants ==
Host plants include the genus Eugenia and Weinmannia, as well as Eucalyptus gunnii and Liquidambar. Other host plants they are reared to are Eugenia cuneifolia, Sclerocarya birrea, Weinmania eriocampa, Rhus cotinus, Schinus terebinthifolia, and Schinus molle. Additional host plants are Cotinus coggygria, Eucalyptus gunnii, Malosma laurina, Pistacia terebinthus, Pistacia lentiscus, Rhus copallinum, Rhus typhina, Schinus molle, Schinus terebinthifolius, Toxicodendron pubescens, Mimosa species and Liquidambar styraciflua.

== Life Cycle ==
=== Eggs ===
Anywhere from 100 to 150 eggs are laid by a single adult female moth after fertilization. An egg hatches 10-20 days after it is laid.

=== Caterpillar ===
After hatching, caterpillars grow and develop over a two month period. At maturity, they will turn bright green in color. In the wild, they feed on the genus Eugenia and Weinmannia, as well as Eucalyptus gunnii and Liquidambar.

=== Pupa ===
The mature caterpillar spins a silk cocoon in which to pupate, where it spends five to six months developing into an adult. The surface of an Argema mittrei cocoon is covered in holes, which are theorized to allow rainwater to drain out, preventing the insect from drowning.

=== Adult ===
The adult moth lacks a functioning digestive system, limiting its lifespan to six to eight days in which to find a mate after emerging from its cocoon. As nocturnal insects, adults are active mainly during the night. Females remain mostly stationary as adults, waiting for a male to locate her. Males will locate a mate by using their wide, feathery antennae to detect a female's pheromones. After fertilization, a female will spend each remaining night of her life searching for host plants on which to lay her eggs.

== Defensive evolutionary traits ==
Moths and bats have been in a coevolutionary arms race due to bats developing echolocation. However, some moth species have developed methods to avoid detection from the echolocation cries of bats and to promote survival if detected. The wings of Argema mittrei are able to significantly absorb ultrasound waves, so bats attempting echolocation will receive a dampened echo, hindering their detection. The long tails present on the hindwings can also disrupt ultrasound waves during flight and furthermore can deflect physical attacks (i.e. letting only the tails be torn off if they are struck). The physical appearance of Argema mittrei also enables crypsis, aposematism, and mimicry.

== Gallery ==
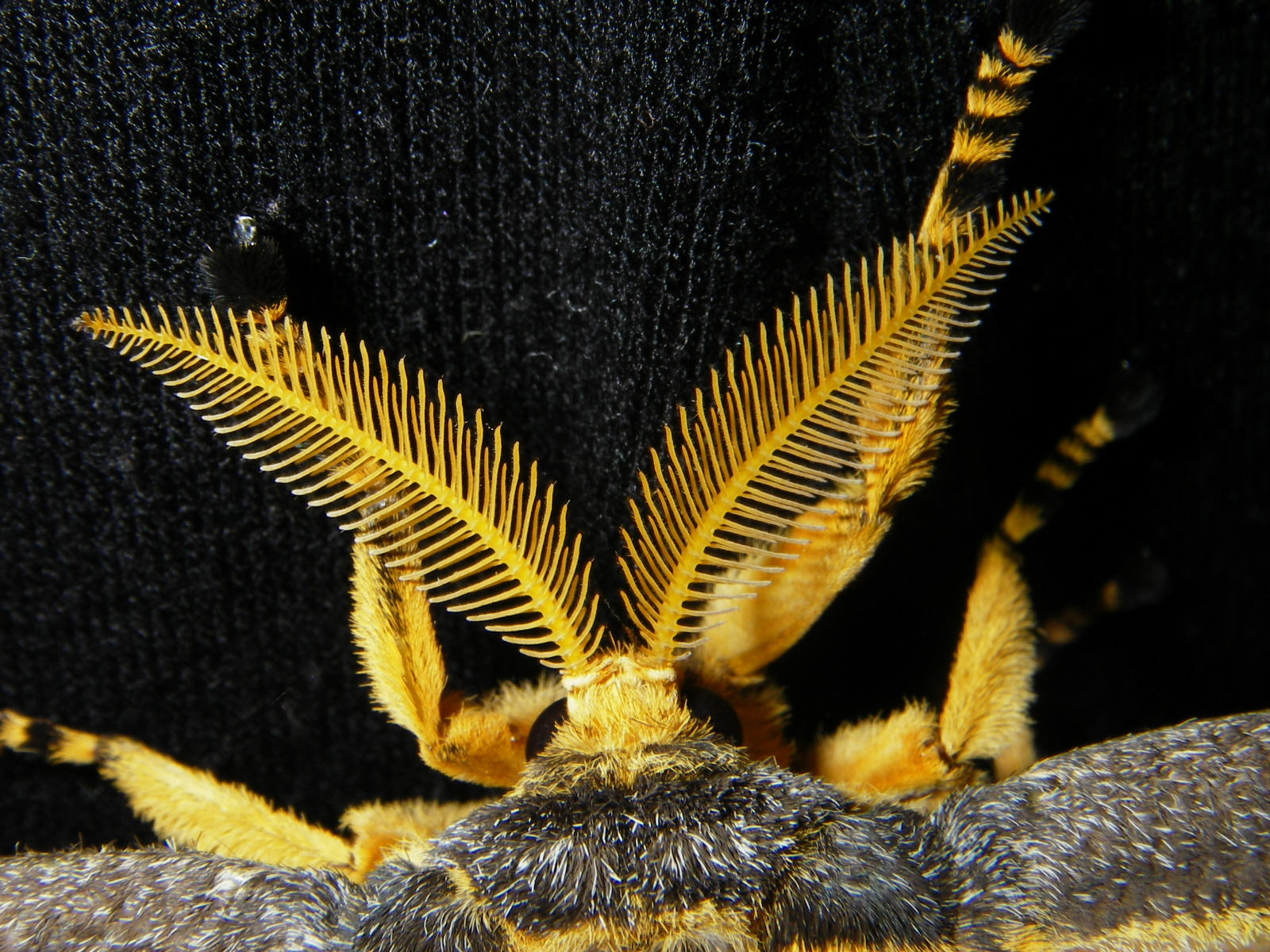
Head of comet moth

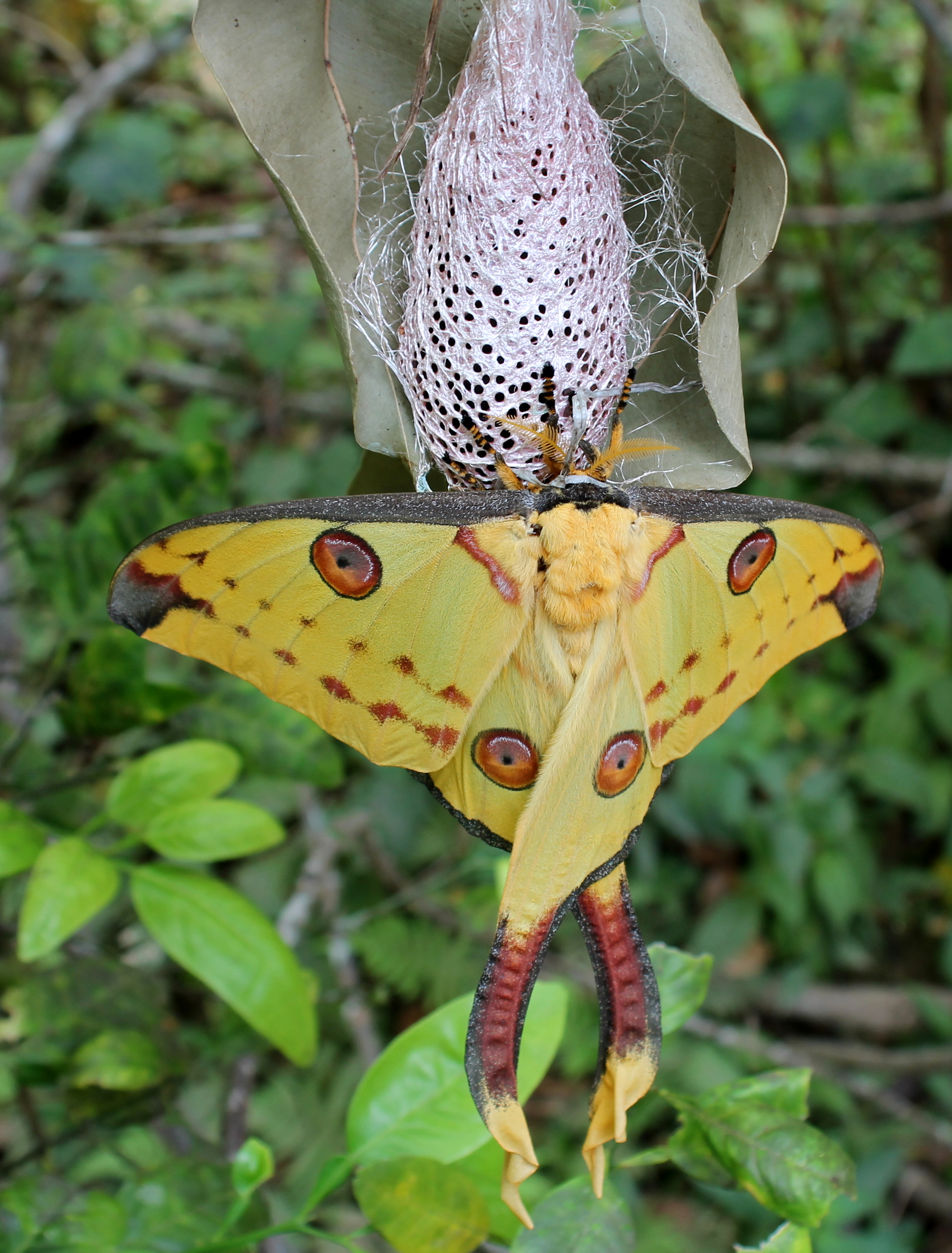
Adult on cocoon

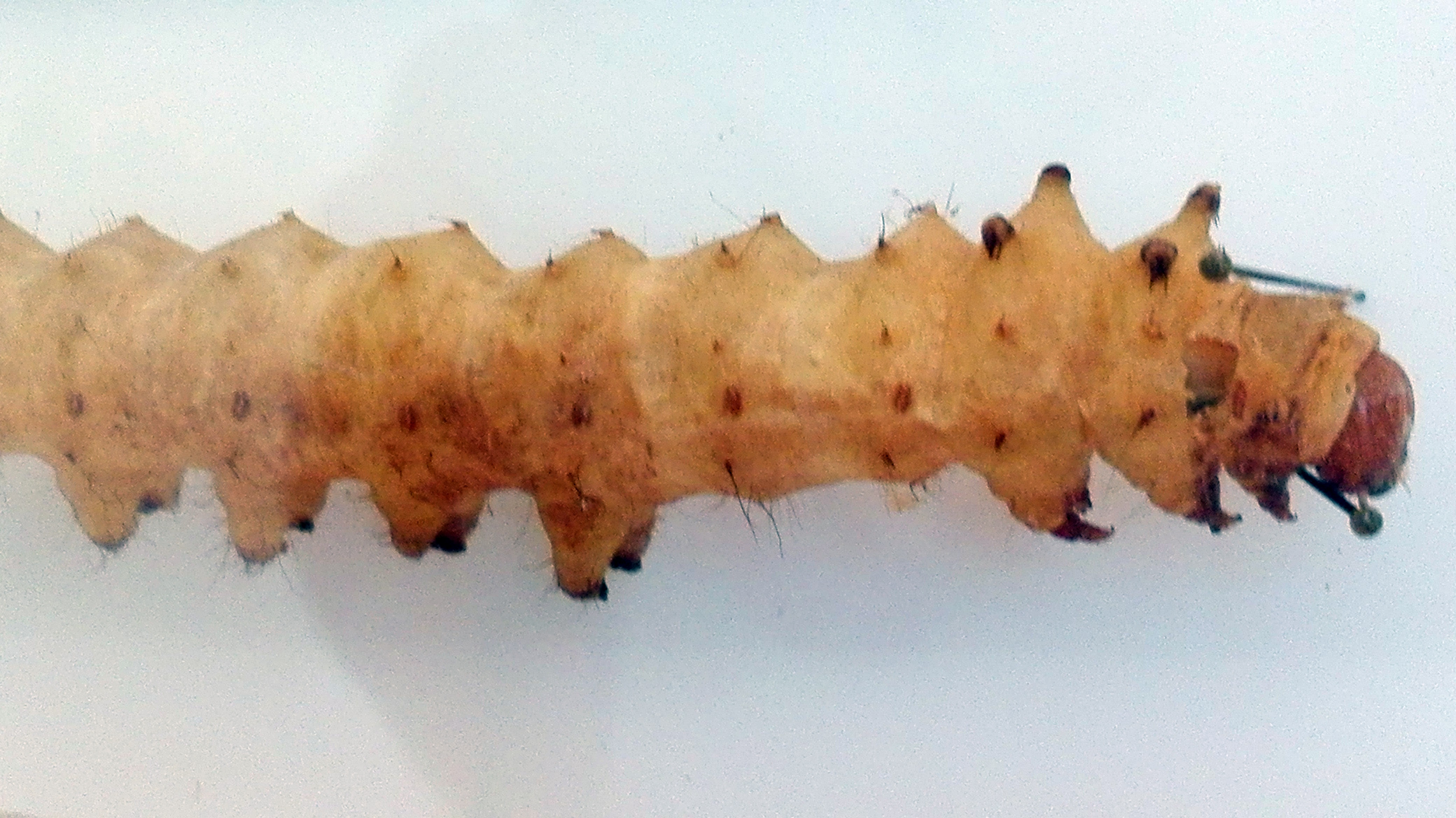
Caterpillar

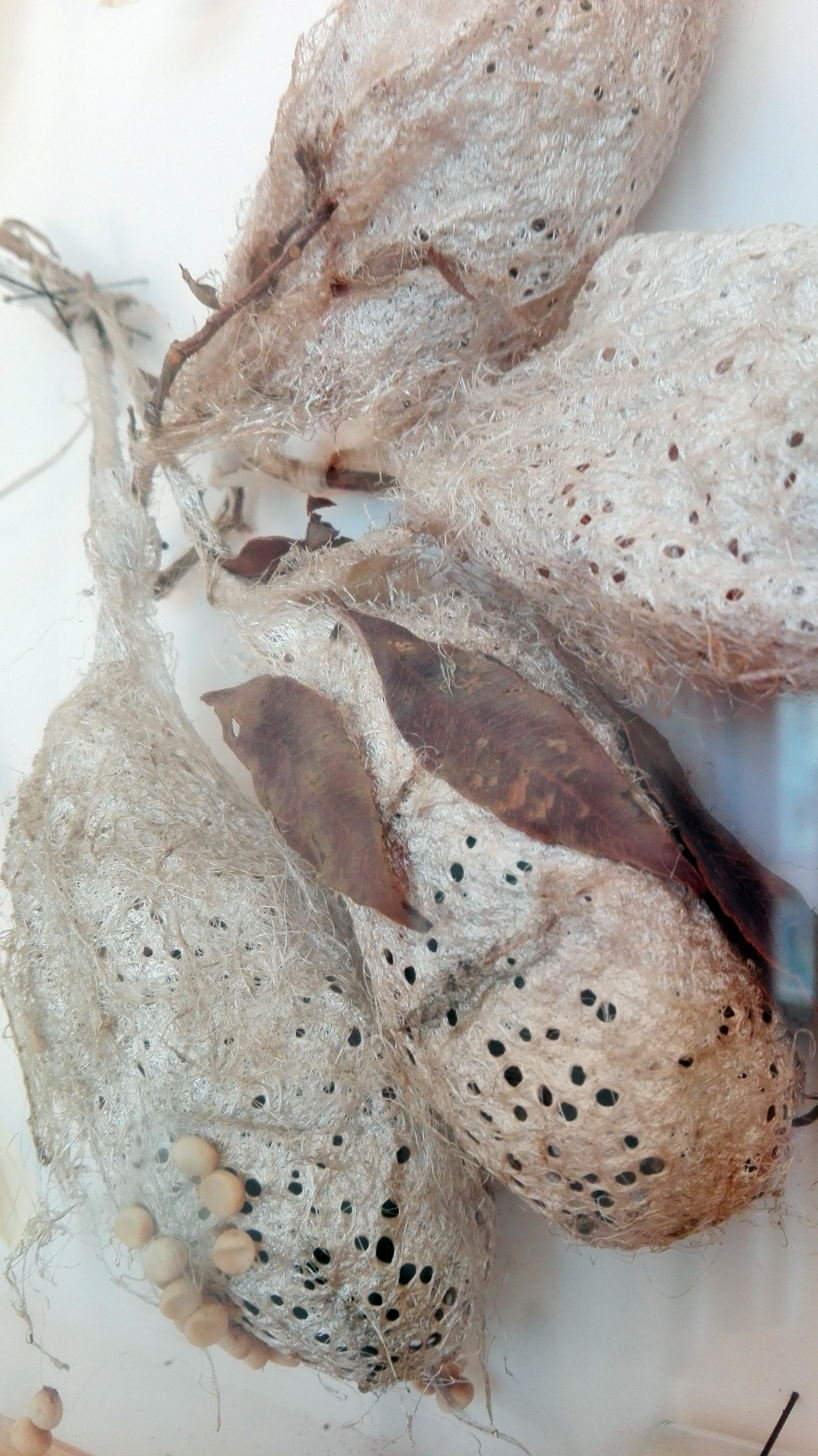
Cocoons and eggs
