= MBS =

MBS may refer to:

== People ==
- Mohammed Ben Sulayem (born 1961), president of the Fédération Internationale de l'Automobile
- Mohammed bin Salman (born 1985), crown prince and prime minister of Saudi Arabia
- Mohan Bikram Singh (born 1935), Nepalese politician

== Places ==
- MBS International Airport (IATA code: MBS), Freeland, Michigan, US
- Marina Bay Sands, Downtown Core, Singapore
- The Metropolitan Borough of Solihull in the West Midlands, England

== Education ==
=== Universities ===
- Alliance Manchester Business School (Alliance MBS), University of Manchester, England
- Mannheim Business School, University of Mannheim, Germany
- MBS College for Cybersecurity and Advanced Technologies, Riyadh, Saudi Arabia
- MBS College of Crete, Heraklion, Crete, Greece
- Melbourne Business School, University of Melbourne, Australia
- Montpellier Business School (MBS), Montpellier, France
- Munich Business School, Germany

=== Other education ===
- Master of Business Studies, an academic qualification
- Malaysia Bible Seminary, Malaysia
- Methodist Boys' School, Kuala Lumpur, Malaysia

== Organizations ==
- Mercey Brothers Sound, a record label
- Montafonerbahn AG, Austrian railway company
- Moroccan British Society
- Motor Bus Society, US

=== Broadcasters ===
- MBS (TV channel), Osaka, Japan
  - MBS Radio (Japan)
- Maharlika Broadcasting System, Philippines, 1980–1986, later People's Television Network
- Maritime Broadcasting System Limited, branded as MBS Radio, Canada
- Mutual Broadcasting System, a former US radio network
- CFTF-DT, owned by Télévision MBS, Inc.

== Science and technology ==
- Metropolitan Beacon System, a 3-D geolocation system
- Micro Bill Systems, potentially unwanted billing software
- Minimum breaking strength of lifting equipment

=== Computing ===
- Megabits per second (Mb/s), a data-rate unit
- Megabytes per second (MB/s), a data-rate unit
- Multibody simulation, numerical simulation

== Other uses ==
- Majority bonus system, a semi-proportional voting system
- Medicare Benefits Schedule, a schedule of fees set by Medicare (Australia)
- MBS (hip hop), an Algerian rap group
- Mortgage-backed security
- Medal for Bravery (Silver), Hong Kong
- Sarangani language of the Philippines (ISO 639 code: mbs)
- The Mysterious Benedict Society, a series of books by Trenton Lee Stewart
