= MB5 =

MB5 may refer to:

== Vehicles and transport ==
- Honda MB5, motorcycle
- Martin-Baker MB 5, UK WWII fighter plane
- Oshkosh MB-5, airport firetruck

== Other uses ==
- MB5, an archaeological site in Mochena Borago, Mount Damota, Ethiopia
- MB5, a herd of Boreal woodland caribou in Manitoba, Canada
- Wal MB5, a guitar from the Wal (bass) series of bass guitar

== See also ==
- MBV (disambiguation)
- MBS (disambiguation)
- MB (disambiguation)
