= Power steering =

Device that helps steer vehicles by augmenting steering effort of the steering wheel

Power steering is a system for reducing a driver's effort to turn a steering wheel of a motor vehicle, by using a power source to assist steering.

Hydraulic or electric actuators add controlled energy to the steering mechanism, so the driver can provide less effort to turn the steering wheel when driving at typical speeds, and considerably reduce the physical effort necessary to turn the wheels when a vehicle is stopped or moving slowly. Power steering can also be engineered to provide some artificial feedback of forces acting on the steered wheels.

Hydraulic power steering systems for cars augment steering effort via an actuator, a hydraulic cylinder that is part of a servo system. These systems have a direct mechanical connection between the steering wheel and the steering linkage that steers the wheels. This means that power-steering system failure (to augment effort) still permits the vehicle to be steered using manual effort alone.

Electric power steering systems use electric motors to provide the assistance instead of hydraulic systems. As with hydraulic types, power to the actuator (motor, in this case) is controlled by the rest of the power steering system.

Other power steering systems (such as those in the largest off-road construction vehicles) have no direct mechanical connection to the steering linkage; they require electrical power. Systems of this kind, with no mechanical connection, are sometimes called "drive by wire" or "steer by wire", by analogy with aviation's "fly-by-wire". In this context, "wire" refers to electrical cables that carry power and data, not thin wire rope mechanical control cables.

Some construction vehicles have a two-part frame with a rugged hinge in the middle; this hinge allows the front and rear axles to become non-parallel to steer the vehicle. Opposing hydraulic cylinders move the halves of the frame relative to each other to steer.

== History ==
The first power steering system on a vehicle was apparently installed in 1876 by a man with the surname of Fitts, but little else is known about him. The next power steering system was put on a Columbia 5-ton truck in 1903 where a separate electric motor was used to assist the driver in turning the front wheels.

Robert E. Twyford, a resident of Pittsburgh, Pennsylvania, included a mechanical power steering mechanism as part of his patent (U.S. Patent 646,477) issued on April 3, 1900 for the first four-wheel drive system.

Francis W. Davis, an engineer of the truck division of Pierce-Arrow, began exploring how steering could be made easier, and in 1926 invented and demonstrated the first practical power steering system. Davis moved to General Motors and refined the hydraulic-assisted power steering system, but the automaker calculated it would be too expensive to produce. Davis then signed up with Bendix, a parts manufacturer for automakers. Military needs during World War II for easier steering on heavy vehicles boosted the need for power assistance on armored cars and tank-recovery vehicles for the British and American armies.

Chrysler Corporation introduced the first commercially available passenger car power steering system on the 1951 Chrysler Imperial under the name "Hydraguide". The Chrysler system was based on some of Davis' expired patents. General Motors introduced the 1952 Cadillac with a power steering system using the work Davis had done for the company almost twenty years earlier.

Charles F. Hammond from Detroit filed several patents for improvements of power steering with the Canadian Intellectual Property Office in 1958.

Starting in the mid-1950s American manufacturers offered the technology as optional or standard equipment while it is widely offered internationally on modern vehicles, owing to the trends toward front-wheel drive, greater vehicle mass, reduced assembly line production costs, and wider tires, which all increase the required steering effort. Heavier vehicles, as are common in some countries, would be extremely difficult to maneuver at low speeds, while vehicles of lighter weight may not need power assisted steering at all.

A study in 1999 on the perceptual fidelity of steering force feedback, found that ordinary real-world truck and car drivers naturally expect an increase in feedback torque as speed increases, and for this reason early forms of power steering, which lacked such effect, were met with disapproval.

== Hydraulic systems ==
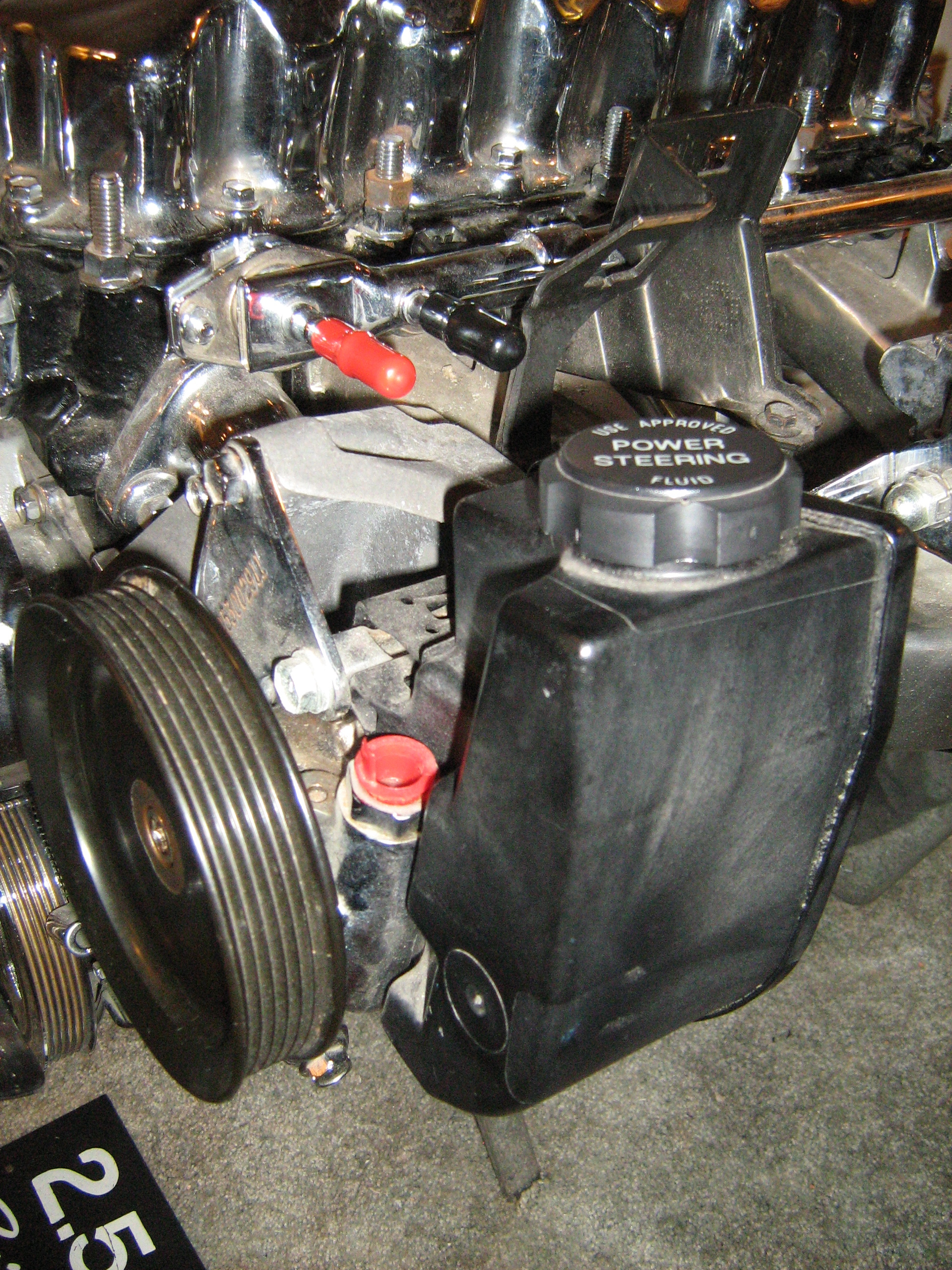
A power steering fluid reservoir and pulley driven pump

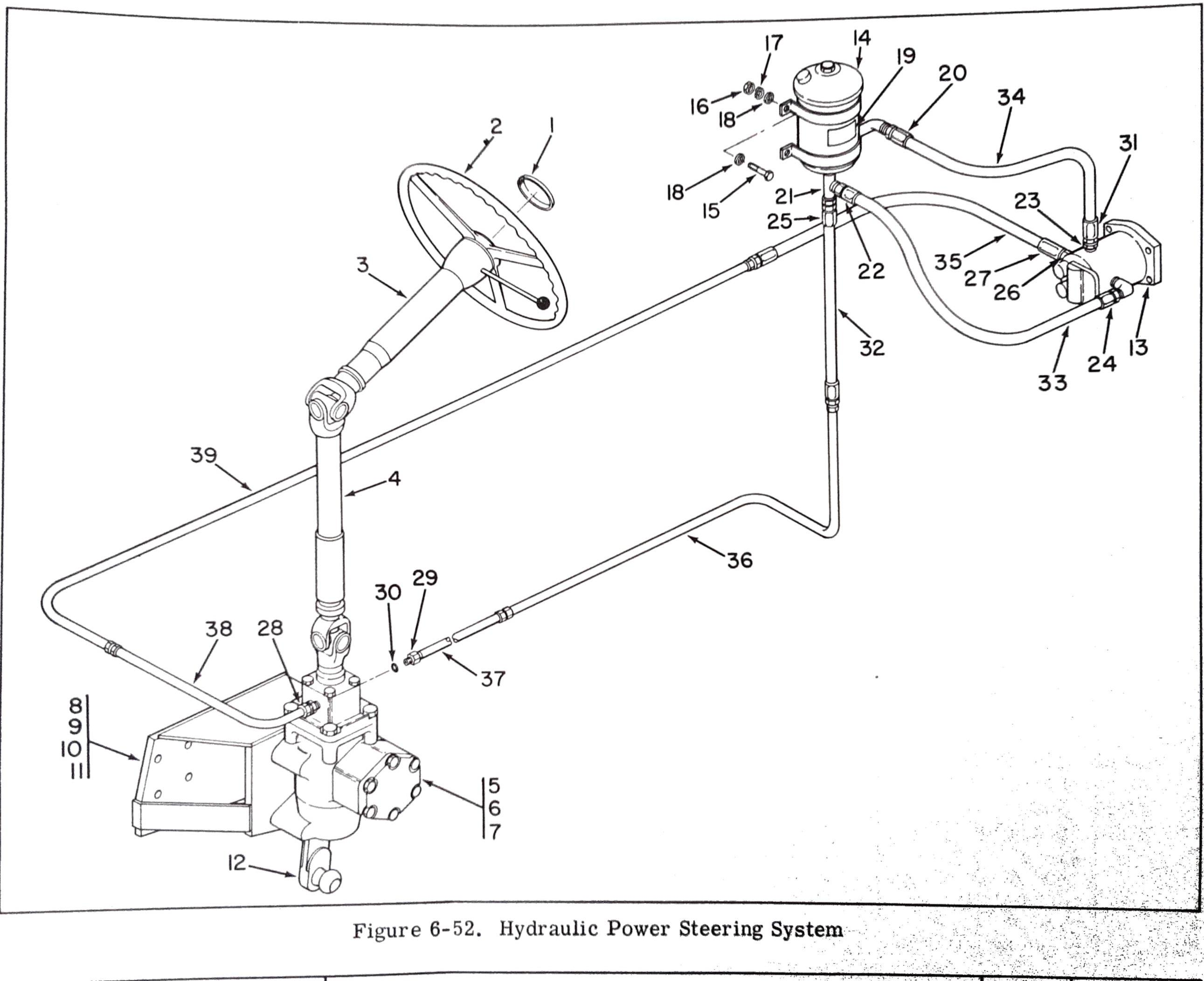
the power steering system for an Oshkosh MB-5

Hydraulic power steering systems work by using a hydraulic system to multiply force applied to the steering wheel inputs to the vehicle's steered (usually front) road wheels. The hydraulic pressure typically comes from a gerotor or rotary vane pump driven by the vehicle's engine. A double-acting hydraulic cylinder applies a force to the steering gear, which in turn steers the roadwheels. The steering wheel operates valves to control flow to the cylinder. The more torque the driver applies to the steering wheel and column, the more fluid the valves allow through to the cylinder, and so the more force is applied to steer the wheels.

One design for measuring the torque applied to the steering wheel has a torque sensor – a torsion bar at the lower end of the steering column. As the steering wheel rotates, so does the steering column, as well as the upper end of the torsion bar. Since the torsion bar is relatively thin and flexible, and the bottom end usually resists being rotated, the bar will twist by an amount proportional to the applied torque. The difference in position between the opposite ends of the torsion bar controls a valve. The valve allows fluid to flow to the cylinder which provides steering assistance; the greater the "twist" of the torsion bar, the greater the force.

Since the hydraulic pumps are positive-displacement type, the flow rate they deliver is directly proportional to the speed of the engine. This means that at high engine speeds the steering would naturally operate faster than at low engine speeds. Because this would be undesirable, a restricting orifice and flow-control valve direct some of the pump's output back to the hydraulic reservoir at high engine speeds. A pressure relief valve prevents a dangerous build-up of pressure when the hydraulic cylinder's piston reaches the end of its stroke.

The steering booster is arranged so that should the booster fail, the steering will continue to work (although the wheel will feel heavier). Loss of power steering can significantly affect the handling of a vehicle. Each vehicle owner's manual gives instructions for inspection of fluid levels and regular maintenance of the power steering system.

The working liquid, also called "hydraulic fluid" or "oil", is the medium by which pressure is transmitted. Common working liquids are based on mineral oil and are similar to, and in some cases the same as, automatic transmission fluid.

Some modern systems also include an electronic control valve to reduce the hydraulic supply pressure as the vehicle's speed increases; this is variable-assist power steering.

=== DIRAVI variable-assist power steering ===
DIRAVI innovated the now common benefit of speed sensitive steering.

In this power steering system, the force steering the wheels comes from the car's high pressure hydraulic system and is always the same no matter what the road speed is. Turning the steering wheel moves the wheels simultaneously to a corresponding angle via a hydraulic cylinder. In order to give some artificial steering feel, there is a separate hydraulically operated system that tries to turn the steering wheel back to centre position. The amount of pressure applied is proportional to road speed, so that at low speeds the steering is very light, and at high speeds it is very difficult to move more than a small amount off centre.

It was invented by Citroën of France.

This system was first introduced in the Citroën SM in 1970, and was known as 'VariPower' in the UK and 'SpeedFeel' in the U.S.

== Electro-hydraulic systems ==
Electro-hydraulic power steering systems, sometimes abbreviated EHPS, and also sometimes called "hybrid" systems, use the same hydraulic assist technology as standard systems, but the hydraulic pressure comes from a pump driven by an electric motor instead of a drive belt at the engine.

In 1965, Ford experimented with a fleet of "wrist-twist instant steering" equipped Mercury Park Lanes that replaced the conventional large steering wheel with two 5-inch (127 mm) rings, a fast 15:1 gear ratio, and an electric hydraulic pump in case the engine stalled.

In 1988, the Subaru XT6 was fitted with a unique Cybrid adaptive electro-hydraulic steering system that changed the level of assistance based on the vehicle's speed.

In 1990, Toyota introduced its second-generation MR2 with electro-hydraulic power steering. This avoided running hydraulic lines from the engine (which was behind the driver in the MR2) up to the steering rack.

In 1994 Volkswagen produced the Golf Mk3 Ecomatic, with an electric pump. This meant that the power steering would still operate while the engine was stopped by the computer to save fuel. Electro-hydraulic systems can be found in some cars by Ford, Volkswagen, Audi, Peugeot, Citroën, SEAT, Škoda, Suzuki, Opel, MINI, Toyota, Honda, and Mazda.

== Electric and electronic systems ==
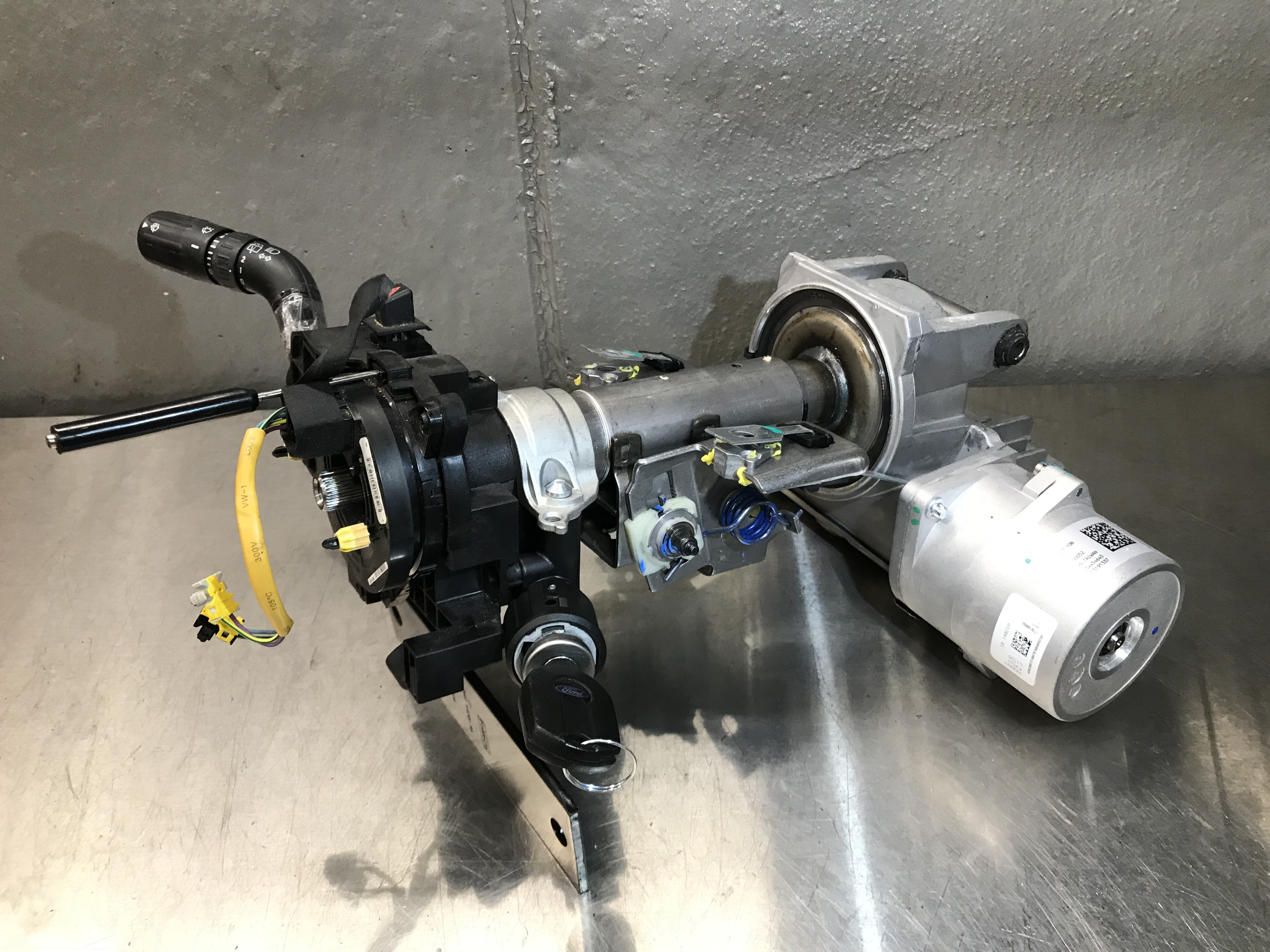
An EPS module with a partially disassembled steering column

Electric power steering and electronic power steering (EPS) or motor-driven power steering (MDPS) uses an electric motor and electronic control unit (ECU) instead of a hydraulic system to assist the driver of the vehicle. Sensors detect the position and torque exerted inside the steering column, and a computer module applies assistive torque via the motor, which connects either to the steering gear or steering column. This allows varied amounts of assistance to be applied depending on driving conditions. Engineers can therefore tailor steering-gear response to variable-rate and variable-damping suspension systems, optimizing ride, handling, and steering for each vehicle. This new technological feature also gave engineers the ability to add new driver assistance features. This includes features such as lane assist, wind drift correction, etc. On Fiat group cars the amount of assistance can be regulated using a button named "CITY" that switches between two different assist curves, while most other EPS systems have variable assist. These give more assistance as the vehicle slows down, and less at faster speeds.

A mechanical linkage between the steering wheel and the steering gear is retained in EPS. In the event of component failure or power failure that causes a failure to provide assistance, the mechanical linkage serves as a back-up. If EPS fails, the driver encounters a situation where heavy effort is required to steer. This heavy effort is similar to that of an inoperative hydraulic steering assist system. Depending on the driving situation, driving skill and strength of the driver, steering assist loss may or may not lead to a crash. The difficulty of steering with inoperative power steering is compounded by the choice of steering ratios in assisted steering gears vs. fully manual. The NHTSA has assisted car manufacturers with recalling EPS systems prone to failure.

Electric systems have an advantage in fuel efficiency because there is no belt-driven hydraulic pump constantly running, whether assistance is required or not, and this is a major reason for their introduction. Another major advantage is the elimination of a belt-driven engine accessory, and several high-pressure hydraulic hoses between the hydraulic pump, mounted on the engine, and the steering gear, mounted on the chassis. This greatly simplifies manufacturing and maintenance. By incorporating electronic stability control electric power steering systems can instantly vary torque assist levels to aid the driver in corrective maneuvers.

In 1986, NSK put the world’s first electric power steering system for battery forklifts into practical use. In 1988, Koyo Seiko (currently JTEKT) and NSK co-developed a column system exclusively for minicars sold only in the domestic market of Japan. The first-ever electric power steering system for mass-produced passenger cars appeared on the Suzuki Cervo in 1988. However, this simple method was not widely adopted by other automakers in the initial years due to the unnatural steering feel of the motor caused by the inertia at the time of rapid steering for danger avoidance in slower speed driving, as well as at the time of faster speed driving in which the electromagnetic clutch makes the steering force smaller, returning to the manual steering mode. In the year 1990, a direct full control system of a rack assist without a clutch was put into practical use in the Honda NSX (initially installed in automatics only). Since then, there has been a transition of trend from brush-attached motors to brushless motors in the rack type for ordinary vehicles and this method has become the mainstream.

Other electric power steering systems (including 4WS) later appeared on the Honda NSX after 1990, the Honda Prelude and the Subaru SVX in 1991, the Nissan 300ZX (Z32; after the Version 3 onwards), Silvia, Skyline, and the Laurel in 1993, the MG F, the FIAT Punto Mk2 in 1999, the Honda S2000 in 1999, Toyota Prius in 2000, the BMW Z4 in 2002, and the Mazda RX-8 in 2003.

The system has been used by various automobile manufacturers, and most commonly applied for smaller cars to reduce fuel consumption and manufacturing costs.

In 2023, Lexus introduced the RZ 450e featuring a steer-by-wire system which eliminates the mechanical linkage between the steering wheel and the wheels, marking a significant advancement in power steering technology.

=== Electrically variable gear ratio systems ===
In 2000, the Honda S2000 Type V featured the first electric power variable gear ratio steering (VGS) system. In 2002, Toyota introduced the "Variable Gear Ratio Steering" (VGRS) system on the Lexus LX 470 and Landcruiser Cygnus, and also incorporated the electronic stability control system to alter steering gear ratios and steering assist levels. In 2003, BMW introduced "active steering" system on the 5 Series.

This system should not be confused with variable assist power steering, which varies steering assist torque, not steering ratios, nor with systems where the gear ratio is only varied as a function of steering angle. These last are more accurately called non-linear types (e.g. Direct-Steer offered by Mercedes-Benz); a plot of steering-wheel position versus axle steering angle is progressively curved (and symmetrical).

== See also ==
- Servomechanism
- Steering engine
- Direct-drive sim racing wheel
