= National Warplane Museum =

- Established: 1994
- Location: Geneseo, New York
- Coordinates: 42.796379°N 77.846364°W
- Type: Aerospace museum, history museum
- Founder: Austin Wadsworth
- Website: nationalwarplane.com

The National Warplane Museum is a warbird and military history museum currently located on the grounds of the Geneseo Airport in Geneseo, New York. Founded in 1994, the museum restores, flies, and displays vintage military aircraft from the Second World War and Korean War eras. In 1998, after a split developed in the membership with two thirds of the group wanting to move to a modern airport and grow, the National Warplane Museum moved to the Elmira-Corning Regional Airport near Horseheads, New York. In 2010, the Horseheads museum reinvented itself as the Wings of Eagles Discovery Center. In 2013, the National Warplane Museum name was reacquired by the 1941 Historical Aircraft Group which remained in Geneseo. The museum hosts the annual Geneseo Airshow, billed as the "Greatest Show On Turf."

== Aircraft collection ==
- Douglas C-47 "W7" – Restored and airworthy
- Beechcraft C-45 – Restored and airworthy
- Douglas B-23 Dragon – Stored, awaiting restoration
- Fairchild C-119 Flying Boxcar – Undergoing restoration (on display)
- Fokker DVII (replica) – Airworthy
- Fokker Dr.1 (replica) Airworthy
- Antonov An-2 "Natasha" – Undergoing maintenance, on display
- Lockheed T-33 Shooting Star – On display
- North American AT-6 – Undergoing restoration
- Grumman F6F Hellcat (replica) – On display
- Beechcraft UC-43 Staggerwing – Airworthy
- Aeronca L-16 – Airworthy
- Piper L-21 (replica) – Airworthy
- YO-55 Ercoupe – On display
- Ryan Navion – Airworthy
- Aero Commander 100 – On display
- Lockheed C-130 Hercules "Saigon Lady" – Undergoing restoration

== Hosted aircraft ==
The museum also hosts several aircraft owned by the Military Aircraft Restoration Corporation.

Five years after taking possession of the aircraft, the museum announced it was ending its lease of the Movie Memphis Belle B-17 in January 2020.

== Land-based equipment collection ==
The museum houses a small group called "The 1941 Motor Pool Restoration Shop". This group acquires, restores, and maintains a variety of land-based military vehicles. Currently working out of a pole barn next to the museum's main hangar, The 1941 Motor Pool Restoration Shop is not a separate business entity, and instead serves as a way to internally categorize museum projects.

- DUKW – Restoration nearly complete. All major systems are functional
- Oshkosh MB-5 – Undergoing restoration. Drive systems, lights and PKP firefighting systems are functional
- GMC CCKW 2½-ton 6×6 truck – Restoration pending. Major components missing
- GE 60 inch carbon arc Searchlight – Light restoration complete. Power supply awaiting restoration

== See also ==
- List of aerospace museums
