= Bateup =

Bateup is an English surname. Notable people with the surname include:

- Teddy Bateup (1881–1939), English footballer
- Hayley Bateup (born 1980), Australian ironwoman, surf life saver, and model
- Ashley Bateup
