= My Bloody Valentine =

My Bloody Valentine may refer to:

== Music ==
- My Bloody Valentine (band), an alternative rock band
  - m b v, a 2013 album by My Bloody Valentine
- "My Bloody Valentine", a song by Good Charlotte from the 2002 album The Young and the Hopeless
- "My Bloody Valentine", a song by Tata Young from the 2009 album Ready for Love

== Film and television ==
- My Bloody Valentine (film), a Canadian slasher film released in 1981
  - My Bloody Valentine 3D, a 2009 remake of the film, shot in 3D
- "My Bloody Valentine" (Supernatural), an episode of the television series Supernatural

== See also ==
- Bloody Valentine (disambiguation)
- MBV (disambiguation)
