= MBV =

MBV may refer to:

- My Bloody Valentine (band), an Irish rock band
  - m b v, a 2013 album by My Bloody Valentine
- MBV Motorsports, a motorsport team
- Mbulungish language (ISO 639-3: mbv), a Guinean language
- MBV-78-A2 mine, a Vietnamese mine
- MayBVlogs, a former British social media influencer

== See also ==
- My Bloody Valentine (disambiguation)
- MB5 (disambiguation)
