= NextNav =

3D geolocation service developer

NextNav, Inc.
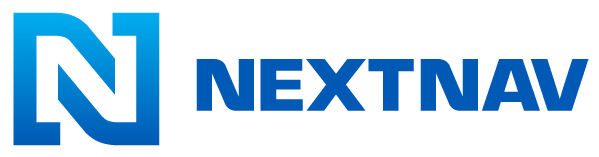
- Formerly: Commlabs
- Type: Public
- Traded as: Nasdaq: NN
- Industry: Location technology, Wireless
- Founded: 2007; 19 years ago
- Headquarters: Reston, Virginia, U.S.
- Number of employees: 61 (2021)
- Website: nextnav.com

NextNav, Inc. is the developer of a 3D geolocation service known as Metropolitan Beacon System (MBS), a wide-area location and timing technology designed to provide services in areas where GPS or other satellite location signals cannot be reliably received. MBS consumes significantly less power than GPS and includes high-precision altitude. In the United States, NextNav operates its MBS network over its spectrum licenses in the 920-928 MHz band. The company went public on Nasdaq in October 2021 with a merger with special-purpose acquisition company Spartacus Acquisition Corporation.

== Technology ==
NextNav distributed its Pinnacle vertical location service in January 2021, which provides floor-level vertical location using barometric sensors from cell phones and other devices. Their Pinnacle network was distributed in partnership with AT&T and is in more than 4,400 cities across the United States. The larger NextNav network uses Metropolitan Beacon System technology to deliver high-precision three-dimensional indoor location capabilities across a market area. MBS is built on principles similar to GPS transmitting precisely timed signals from a network of wide-area beacons enabling receivers to use trilateration techniques to determine their precise locations.

Due to the terrestrial placement of the transmitters and the sub-GHz nature of the signal, MBS signals can travel several kilometers and—because the network is specifically designed, deployed, and managed for indoor positioning—can be reliably received in deep indoor conditions that block satellite signals (e.g., GPS, GLONASS). MBS signals also enable location to be computed with far lower power drain than GPS. In addition, the system incorporates barometric pressure compensation technology that allows receivers equipped with pressure sensors to compute their altitude very precisely, typically within a floor.

A byproduct of the GPS-like operating principles of NextNav's MBS network is the ability to deliver high-precision (Stratum-1-level) timing to indoor locations or in the event of GPS outages.

MBS receivers are being commercialized as an additional constellation added to multi-constellation GNSS processors. Today's GPS processors typically process additional satellite constellations, and the MBS processing capability constitutes primarily firmware additions.

The performance of the technology under emergency dialing conditions was originally demonstrated in the CSRIC III test bed in San Francisco in 2012, with performance enhancements added on an ongoing basis. More recently the technology was enabled in the primary global telecommunication standards bodies, 3GPP (Release 13) and OMA (SUPL 2.0.3). MBS signal technology is available under FRAND terms.

The technology can be scaled for any location application, including services to mobile phones, the Internet of Things, and enterprise and public safety applications.

On March 11, 2024, NextNav announced it signed an agreement to acquire spectrum licenses covering an additional 4 MHz in the lower 900 MHz band (902–928) from Telesaurus Holdings GB LLC, and Skybridge Spectrum Foundation. NextNav acquired the additional spectrum licenses for a total purchase price of up to $50 million, paid for through a combination of cash and NextNav common stock. The acquired licenses are in the same lower 900 MHz band as NextNav's current licensed spectrum.

On April 16, 2024, NextNav filed a rulemaking petition with the Federal Communications Commission to deliver a spectrum solution in the Lower 900 MHz band on the grounds that it would facilitate a terrestrial positioning, navigation, and timing network (as a complement and backup to GPS) and broadband. As of September 5, 2024 the comment period had closed and was strongly opposed by American Radio Relay League as well as the LoRa-based Meshtastic community which also operate in the 902-928Mhz band.

== Coverage ==
NextNav's Urban and Indoor Positioning service TerraPoiNT is available in San Francisco Bay Area, McLean, VA and other select markets. Its Pinnacle vertical location service is available in more than 4,400 cities nationwide and has partnered with AT&T FirstNet to provide vertical location service for First Responders.

== Acquisitions ==
In November 2022, NextNav has recently completed the acquisition of a geolocation system provider based in France, specializing in low-power technologies, Nestwave.
