= Wings of Eagles Discovery Center =

- Location within New York
- Former name: National Warplane Museum
- Established: 1983
- Location: Elmira, New York
- Coordinates: 42.1553°N 76.9131°W
- Type: Aviation museum
- Founder: W. Austin Wadsworth
- Website: www.wingsofeagles.com

The Wings of Eagles Discovery Center is an aviation museum located at the Elmira Corning Regional Airport near Elmira, New York in Chemung County, New York.

== History ==
=== Establishment ===
The origins of the museum lie in the establishment of a flying club by W. Austin Wadsworth in the early 1960s. (Note: Austin was the great-great-grandson of James Wadsworth, one of a pair of brothers who were early settlers and major landowners in the Geneseo region, and the Master of Hounds for the family's fox hunt.) In 1978, he and nine other individuals began renting land near Geneseo, New York. In 1980, after a visit by planes from the Canadian Warplane Heritage group, it began holding an annual "1941 Air Show".

The National Warplane Museum was founded in 1983. The museum purchased a B-17 in early 1986. By September, it had announced plans a $3.8 million facility that included a new hangar. By 1988, a 30,000 sq ft (2,800 m^{2}) hangar had been mostly completed. By 1989, the airshow had become one of the largest civilian airshows in the United States. The museum's aircraft were also flying to 22 other airshows.

By 1993, Wadsworth had become displeased with how much time the aircraft spent away from the museum and attempted to address the situation by adding new conditions to its lease for 400 acres (1,600,000 m^{2}) nearby. As a result, the museum's board voted to move the airshow to Batavia, New York in 1994. However, Wadsworth announced plans to launch a competing airshow in Geneseo and formed the 1941 Historical Aircraft Group.

By April 1996, four sites were being considered: one in Chemung County, another in Genesee County, the Elmira Corning Regional Airport and the Oneida County Airport. By the end of the month, it had been narrowed down to three. On June 6, the museum's board announced it supported the site in Elmira and on the 29th a group of museum members visited the area.

A vote to move to the Elmira Corning Regional Airport in Chemung County on July 10 failed, as less than two-thirds of museum members approved the motion. By this point, Wadsworth had been removed from his position. A second vote in December met the threshold and the proposition was passed. The museum began fundraising to build four hangars and an administration building at the airport the following day.

=== Move to Elmira ===
The museum announced the first airplanes would be moved on 8 May 1997 and it reopened at the new location on July 12, 1998. However, difficulties holding its largest fundraiser, the airshow, led to a decrease in visitors and a financial shortfall. (Note: A plan to offer rides in aircraft was rejected by the FAA after it was determined that the museum didn't have a license to do so in experimental aircraft.) By 2001, the museum had incurred significant debt. Following the election of a new board president, Gary Roush, the executive director, Stephen C. Low, resigned. The museum was forced to close on September 17, 2001. The next March, a plan was agreed to by the state education department to sell the museum's B-17. As part of the museum's reinvention, greater emphasis was placed on the history of individuals rather than just the planes themselves. The museum reopened on April 1, 2002. One year later, the museum was on more sound financial footing and a grant from the state had removed the need to sell the B-17. The next year saw the organization place greater emphasis on science education, announce plans to once again hold an airshow and change its name to the Wings of Eagles Museum. In December 2005, the museum, by then called the Wings of Eagles Discovery Center, finally paid off the remainder of its debt by selling its B-17 to an aviation maintenance company in Orange County, California. In 2006, it announced plans to host a Challenger Learning Center.

=== New facility ===
The museum was forced to move from its facility in October 2010 after Sikorsky Aircraft took over the 25,000 sq ft (2,300 m^{2}) hangar and associated building. The museum reopened in a temporary location in February 2011. The following month, the county purchased a 24,000 sq ft (2,200 m^{2}) former horse arena and convert it into a new home for the museum. The new facility was unveiled on September 6, 2012, and aircraft began being moved to it a week later. (Note: The National Warplane Museum name was acquired by a different organization in 2013.)

Senator Kirsten Gillibrand announced plans to introduce three STEM related bills to the United States Congress at the museum in March 2014. The museum acquired a GAM-77 for restoration in November 2015. It received a $1.25 million grant from NASA in September 2016 to create a recreation of a base on Mars.

== Exhibits ==
The museum has an escape room and a recreation of a Mars habitat. Historical exhibits include displays about Bessie Coleman and the Tuskegee Airmen.

== Collection ==
A majority of the aircraft are displayed outside

F-14 Tomcat at the Wings of Eagles Discovery Center

- Bell UH-1H Iroquois 69-16723
- Douglas B-26B Invader 41-39516
- Fairchild Republic A-10A Thunderbolt II 75-0293
- Grumman F-14A Tomcat 161605
- Grumman OV-1C Mohawk 62-5856
- Grumman TBM-3E Avenger 91752
- Hughes OH-6A Cayuse 67-16576
- LTV A-7D Corsair II 69-6200
- Martin RB-57A Canberra 52-1459
- McDonnell Douglas F-4B Phantom II 152256
- McDonnell Douglas F-15A Eagle 75-0026
- North American AGM-28 Hound Dog
- Piper J-4A Cub Coupe
- RLU-1 Breezy
- Schweizer LNS-1 N53275
- Westland Whirlwind HAR.10 XJ763
