= Movieland =

Former subscription-based movie download service

- Movieland home page, showing various categories of content. A sidebar claims "No Spyware", "Virus Free", and "No Extra Charge"
- Website type: Subscription-based movie download service
- Available in: English
- Owners: Digital Enterprises, Inc.
- Website: Movieland.com
- Commercial: Yes
- Registration: Required
- Launched: 2005
- Current status: Offline

Movieland, also known as Movieland.com, Moviepass.tv and Popcorn.net, was a subscription-based movie download service that has been the subject of thousands of complaints to the Federal Trade Commission, the Washington State Attorney General's Office, the Better Business Bureau, and other agencies by consumers who said they were held hostage by its repeated pop-up windows and demands for payment, triggered after a free 3-day trial period. Many said they had never even heard of Movieland until they saw their first pop-up. Movieland advertised that the service had "no spyware", and that no personal information would need to be filled out to begin the free trial.

The Federal Trade Commission (FTC) filed a complaint against Movieland and eleven other defendants in August 2006, charging them with having "engaged in a nationwide scheme to use deception and coercion to extract payments from consumers." The Attorney General of the state of Washington also filed a complaint, charging Movieland and several other defendants with violating that state's Computer Spyware Act and its Consumer Protection Act.

The files of the popup were found on Wayback Machine in August 2022.

Another version of the popup was found on Wayback Machine in January 2023, with the original embed page and parameters, but without some files (some missing files are saved in the older link above).

== Overview ==
Movieland advertised its movie download service by using pop-up ads at other sites. The ads offered a three-day free trial, with access to members-only content including music, news, updated sports scores and adult movies. The ads said there were no forms to fill out, and no need to provide a credit card number or an e-mail address, making the trial appear anonymous. The site's homepage stated that it has "No Spyware", is "Virus Free", and "No Extra Charge". The site installed a program, MediaPipe, which was used to access the service.

== Early consumer complaints ==
Movieland.com began operations sometime in the fall of 2005 or earlier. Consumer complaints began soon thereafter. Most consumers claimed they had never signed up for the free trial, never used the service, and never even heard of Movieland until they got their first pop-up demand for payment. Some said they found the software on their computers after downloading a screensaver or other free utility. The company denied that it installed its software by stealthy means.

Media coverage as early as January 2006 recounted consumer complaints and mentioned that several anti-spyware companies were buying Google advertisements boasting their product's ability to "Remove Movieland Now". In a report updated February 20, 2008, the Berkman Center for Internet & Society at Harvard Law School calls Movieland's MediaPipe component "badware" because "it does not fully disclose what it is installing, does not completely remove all components and 'obligations' during the uninstall process, and modifies other software without disclosure." Richard Stiennon of IT-Harvest referred to Movieland as a form of "Ransomware" due to its behaviour. As of July 2008, the MediaPipe report is still cited by the Berkman Center for Internet & Society at Harvard Law School.

== Complaints by the FTC ==

The expired trial and payment options screens as presented by the Moviepass software, as illustrated in the FTC's complaint. These pop-up windows blanked the entire screen and forced the user into continuing the process of purchasing the service, with no visible method of closing them.

On August 8, 2006, the FTC filed a complaint in United States District Court "to obtain preliminary and permanent injunctive relief, rescission of contracts, restitution, disgorgement and other equitable relief for Defendants' deceptive and unfair acts or practices in violation of Section 5(a) of the FTC Act".

The complaint alleged that the defendants were demanding payment to fix a problem that they themselves created, and were installing disruptive software that could not be removed through reasonable means. According to the FTC complaint, Movieland repeatedly bombarded consumers with pop-up windows, accompanied by music that lasted nearly a minute. They demanded a minimum payment of $29.95 to end the recurring pop-up cycle, claiming that consumers had signed up for a three-day free trial and did not cancel the service before the trial period was over.

The complaint charged that:

Installation of Defendants' download manager is merely a smoke screen concealing Defendants' true purpose: to install software and other files onto consumers' computers that enable Defendants to launch pop-up windows on consumers computers demanding payments to Defendants. These pop-up windows, which display both textual and audiovisual payment demands, significantly disrupt consumers' use of their computers. After Defendants cause these pop-up payment demands to display on a particular computer for the first time, they cause them to redisplay again and again with ever-increasing frequency."

The pop-ups had a large dark background and took up much of the screen, blocking access to other windows, and did not contain close or minimize buttons; forcing the user to continue. The first pop-up showed the date and time "our content access software was installed on your system and your 3 day free trial began", the text "Click 'Continue' to purchase your license and stop these reminders", and a graphic reading "STOP THESE REMINDERS NOW" and "CLICK CONTINUE". The only option offered was the button labeled "Continue".

Clicking "Continue" brought up the next pop-up, a 40-second audiovisual clip featuring a woman who introduced herself as "your personal customer service representative" and stated "Because you did not cancel during your trial period, you are now legally obligated to make your payment as per the terms and conditions you agreed to when you installed our content delivery software." As the clip neared its conclusion, a new dialog box entitled "PAYMENT OPTIONS" appeared. Choosing its "Close this window" option ended the pop-ups until the unvarying cycle began again.

In addition, the complaint alleged that the defendants made numerous false statements in attempting to collect payments from consumers, claiming that the computer owner or someone else consented to receiving the pop-up payment demands until they paid, the owner of any computer that received the pop-ups was legally obligated to pay Movieland, and that the computer owner was obligated to satisfy any contract that any other person entered into while using the computer. The only customer service telephone number provided was a 900 number. When consumers called it, a recorded greeting told them that they would incur a $34.95 charge if they did not hang up within three seconds.

The complaint also alleged that the defendants made it difficult or impossible for consumers to uninstall the software. Those attempting to remove it through the Windows Control Panel "Add or Remove Programs" function were redirected to a web page telling them that they had to pay the $29.95 fee to stop the pop-ups. The only way many consumers could regain control of their computers was to pay the fee, or pay a computer technician to remove the software.

=== Movieland's position ===
Movieland representatives said the downloads were not spyware and did not get on computers accidentally, insisting they were not "drive-by downloads". They said the FTC lawsuit was "improperly brought", and pointed out that at the time the complaint was filed a federal judge rejected the FTC's request for a temporary restraining order that would have immediately ended the cited billing practices.

The terms of service at the Movieland web site warned that if users did not cancel or pay during the three-day period, pop-up billing reminders would begin and "will appear more frequently until you choose one of the payment options and pay for the license."

Movieland said the pop-ups were "an anti-fraud mechanism" that cannot be received without consumers intentionally downloading the software through several intentional steps, each of which has a default setting of "cancel". The company also stated "there are no extrinsic programs (adware or otherwise) bundled with our software." The company disputed the FTC claim that the software was "very difficult to get rid of", and said it could be removed using the Windows Control Panel.

=== Defendants ===
The following ten companies and two individuals were named as defendants in the FTC complaint:

- Digital Enterprises, Inc. d/b/a Movieland.com
- Triumphant Videos, Inc. d/b/a Popcorn.net
- Pacificon International, Inc. d/b/a Vitalix
- Alchemy Communications, Inc.
- AccessMedia Networks, Inc.
- Innovative Networks, Inc.
- Film Web, Inc.
- Binary Source, Inc. d/b/a Moviepass.tv
- Mediacaster, Inc. d/b/a Mediacaster.net
- CS Hotline, Inc.
- Easton Herd, sole officer and director of Digital Enterprises and Triumphant Videos
- Andrew Garroni, an officer or director of Pacificon, Alchemy, Film Web, and Binary Source

=== Pre-trial stipulations ===
In November 2006, the defendants and the FTC signed stipulations governing their pre-trial conduct. Without admitting any wrongdoing, violation of the law, or involvement in the acts and practices alleged in the complaint, the defendants agreed to make clear and prominent disclosures prior to any software download or installation, to not download or install software without the user's explicit consent and without disclosing clearly and prominently in the site's terms of service the nature, frequency, and duration of any pop-up windows that may appear regarding any purported obligation for payment. The pop-ups also must not lock out access to the rest of the computer.

They also agreed to fixed limits on how many pop-ups they can generate on a computer (maximum of 5 per day, 1 per hour), the requirement to provide a mute button for any sound content in the pop-ups and be able to close the windows, and provide a hyperlink with toll-free number and email utility, to request stopping the pop-ups under certain conditions. The defendants also promised to clearly label any single-click download or install buttons, and not pre-select these as the default.

They are also required to not represent that consumers have any "legal" or "contractual" obligation to pay for the software unless the computer owner has provided personal identification and agreed to pay, and that failure to pay will result in collection proceedings or affect the computer owner's credit status unless the owner has provided personal identification such as a credit card and agreed to pay. Customer service agents may state that they "believe" the computer owner is responsible for paying for the download, and offer several purchase options including a one-time 30-day non-renewing license for $29.95, after which access to the service will terminate.

=== FTC settlement ===
The FTC complaint was scheduled to be tried in United States District Court in January 2008, but before trial, the defendants chose to settle out of court with both the FTC.

Movieland settled with the FTC in September 2007. Without admitting any wrongdoing or violation of the law, the defendants agreed to make permanent the terms of the pre-trial stipulations including limiting the number, frequency and duration of the billing pop-ups; and to pay the FTC $501,367 to reimburse consumers who paid for the program as a result of the repeated pop-up demands. The defendants also agreed to stop offering anonymous free trials, have users certify at install time that they are at least 18 years of age, provide an install-time link to their terms of service or end user license agreement, not download software that reinstalls itself after a user has removed it, and to prominently post removal instructions at their web sites.

The agreement also requires Herd and Garroni to notify the FTC of any change of name, address or employment status, and of any new business affiliations, for five years.

== Complaints by the state of Washington ==
On August 14, 2006, Rob McKenna, the Attorney General of the state of Washington charged Movieland, Digital Enterprises, Herd, and Garroni with violating the state's Computer Spyware Act and its Consumer Protection Act.

The complaint, filed in King County Superior Court in Seattle, alleged misrepresentations and unlawful business acts and practices similar to those alleged in the FTC complaint, and further alleged violations of Washington state law.

The defendants were subject to fines of up to $100,000 per violation of the Spyware Act and $2,000 per violation of the Consumer Protection Act if found liable. They were also subject to paying restitution to affected consumers.

=== Alleged violations of law ===
The alleged violations of Washington state law included taking control of a user's computer in violation of the Spyware Act and the Consumer Protection Act (CPA), by remotely installing billing software that initiates and controls the pop-up cycle, misrepresenting the ability to uninstall software in violation of the same acts, by listing the software in Add/Remove Programs although the software cannot be uninstalled, unconscionable business practices in violation of the CPA, by the "aggressive and harassing" billing method used and the failure to disclose it, including use of a billing method "that forces payment by completely obstructing users' access to their computers", threats, harassment and intimidation in billing practices in violation of the CPA, by threatening collection proceedings and an adverse effect on users' credit records, while in fact defendants do not even know the consumer's name; and referring to consumers' "legal obligation" to pay, when in fact there is no legally binding contract, failure to disclose material facts in violation of the CPA, the "aggressive, relentless, threatening" form of the payment demands; the fact that the uninstallation option for the software will be disabled; and that the defendants "transmit software to the user's computer surreptitiously", and misrepresentations in violation of the CPA, including stating the software contains "no spyware" when in fact the software itself constitutes spyware by its behavior.

In announcing the suit following a seven-month investigation, Washington Attorney General Rob McKenna rejected one possible defense. "The defendants' claim that users are legally obligated to pay for their service lacks merit because consumers did not provide knowing consent to the installation of the relentless pop-up demands", he said. "Furthermore, computer owners are not responsible to satisfy contracts that other people, including minors, entered into while using a computer." He also said that the defendants' threats of collection proceedings and adverse effects on users' credit ratings were empty, as the defendants had no way to personally identify computer users.

Assistant Attorney General Paula Selis said the tactics forced some consumers to give in and pay between $20 and $100 for the service. She said, "We sued them because we were getting complaints from consumers who felt that they were being harassed and held over a barrel for payments that they didn't agree to make." Selis said, "It was harassment, it was intimidation of the consumer. It was using a high-pressure tactic to make him or her pay for something they were not legally obligated to pay."

=== Settlement ===
Movieland settled with Washington in April 2007 under terms similar to the FTC settlement but specific to Washington consumers, agreeing to pay Washington $50,000 as consumer reimbursement and to prominently state all important contract terms, including the cost of the subscription service, in advertisements.

== See also ==
- Micro Bill Systems and Platte Media, a similar business that operated in the UK.
