= Bloody Valentine =

Bloody Valentine may refer to:

- "Bloody Valentine" (song), a song by Machine Gun Kelly from the 2020 album Tickets to My Downfall
- "Bloody Valentine", a song by Kim Petras from the 2019 album Turn Off the Light
- Bloody Valentine tragedy, a fictional event in the anime Mobile Suit Gundam SEED
- Bloody Valentine, a 2010 novella in the Blue Bloods by Melissa de la Cruz

== See also ==
- My Bloody Valentine (disambiguation)
