= Moroccan British Society =

- Abbreviation: MBS
- Formation: 23 February 2003
- Website: Official website

The Moroccan British Society (MBS) was created on 23 February 2003. Its goal is ‘to provide means and allow Moroccans and British people to acquire a better mutual understanding of their civilizations, cultures and political, academic, scientific, economic, financial, and commercial institutions so as to promote and foster their friendly relations and their cooperative ties in every domain.’ Princess Lalla Joumala Alaoui is president of the MBS since its inception.

Lalla Joumala called for greater dialogue between faiths. Speaking at a 2007 conference on the necessity for Muslims to adopt democracy, she said that there was a ‘vital necessity’ to increase dialogue between the three religions (Christianity, Judaism and Islam); that ‘values shared by these religions transcend the theological differences of our spiritual pluralism’; and that a better understanding of ‘what we share can help us better accept and respect what separates us.’

== Activities ==
In 2007, the MBS became the main sponsor of ‘Sacred: Discover what we share’, a British Library project that displayed the oldest surviving texts of the Abrahamic faiths side by side.

Joumala described the project as ‘aiming to foster inter-religious dialogue in these times of prevalent political and religious tensions internationally’. She went on: ‘The Moroccan British Society, in contributing to this event, seeks to underline the Moroccan example, where interfaith respect is the norm. Islam in Morocco has always opposed extremism and enabled people to live in peace, harmony and good intelligence with all faiths and religious communities.

== King Mohammed VI Fellowship ==
In 2004, the Middle East Centre (MEC) at St Antony’s College of Oxford University received a £1.5m donation from the Moroccan British Society (MBS) to establish ‘the King Mohammed VI Fellowship in Moroccan and Mediterranean Studies’. In 2007, Eugene Rogan wrote that ‘The King Mohammed VI Fellowship in Moroccan and Mediterranean Studies has served as the basis for extending cooperation between Moroccan academics and Great Britain, and has enabled the MEC to develop its work in North Africa significantly.’ This was criticised by Robin Simcox of the Centre for Social Cohesion (which later merged with the neoconservative think-tank, the Henry Jackson Society).
