= MBS College for Cybersecurity and Advanced Technologies =

College in Riyadh, Saudi Arabia

Prince Mohammed Bin Salman College for Cybersecurity, Artificial Intelligence and Advanced Technologies
- كلية الأمير محمد بن سلمان للأمن السيبراني والذكاء الاصطناعي والتقنيات المتقدمة
- Former names: College of Cyber Security, Artificial Intelligence and Advanced Technologies
- Established: 14 April 2018; 8 years ago
- Founder: Saud al-Qahtani
- Location: Riyadh, Saudi Arabia

The Prince Mohammed Bin Salman College for Cybersecurity, Artificial Intelligence and Advanced Technologies (Arabic: كلية الأمير محمد بن سلمان للأمن السيبراني والذكاء الاصطناعي والتقنيات المتقدمة) is a higher education technological college in Riyadh, Saudi Arabia. Established by Saud al-Qahtani in 2018, it is named after Mohammed bin Salman, the Crown Prince of Saudi Arabia since 2017. It is the first academic institute in Saudi Arabia dedicated for the study of cybersecurity and artificial intelligence.

Just prior to its inauguration, it was renamed after the country's crown prince, Mohammed bin Salman after getting assent for the proposal put forward by Saud al-Qahtani – a top aide to the crown prince. Since its inception, it has signed pacts with some of the renowned institutions around the world, including Stanford University, Carnegie Mellon University, Draper University, Booz Allen Hamilton and SANS Institute.

== History ==
In March 2018, the then President and Chairman of the Saudi Federation for Cybersecurity, Programming and Drones Saud al-Qahtani issued a decision to establish the College of Cyber Security, Artificial Intelligence and Advanced Technologies in Riyadh. Prior to its official inauguration in April 2018, the college was renamed as the Prince Mohammed bin Salman College for Cyber Security, Artificial Intelligence and Advanced Technologies after getting the crown prince's assent for the renaming proposal put forward by the Saudi Federation for Cybersecurity, Programming and Drones. Dr. Abdullah bin Abdulaziz al-Dahlawi serves as the institute's inaugural and acting dean. In April 2018, the college signed a memorandum of understanding with Columbia, Maryland-based cybersecurity firm Chiron Technology Services, Inc. In June 2018, the college signed a memorandum of understanding with San Francisco's Stanford University to contribute to the design of academic content of the institute.

In July 2018, the college signed a partnership with IronNet Cybersecurity – an American private sector cybersecurity firm founded by retired four-star general of the United States Army Keith B. Alexander who was the first head of the U.S. Cyber Command. In January 2019, the college announced that it will soon offer bachelors program in cybersecurity in partnership with Carnegie Mellon University. In April 2019, the college signed a cooperation agreement with Redmond-based DigiPen Institute of Technology. In August 2019, the college signed an agreement with Chinese information technology conglomerate Inspur Group. In September 2019, the college signed an agreement with British multinational arms, security, and aerospace company – BAE Systems.
