= Metropolitan Beacon System =

Location technology

Metropolitan Beacon System (MBS) is a precise three-dimensional location and timing technology designed to provide services to entire metropolitan areas where GPS or other satellite location signals are blocked or can’t be reliably received.

NextNav is one of the early adapters and developers of MBS.
