= Hose reel =

A hose reel is a cylindrical spindle made of either metal, fiberglass, or plastic, and is used for storing a hose. The most common styles of hose reels are spring driven (which is self retracting), hand crank, or motor driven. Hose reels are categorized by the diameter and length of the hose they hold, the pressure rating and the rewind method. Hose reels can either be fixed in a permanent location, like wall mounted hose reels, or they can be portable and attached to a truck, wagon, or cart.

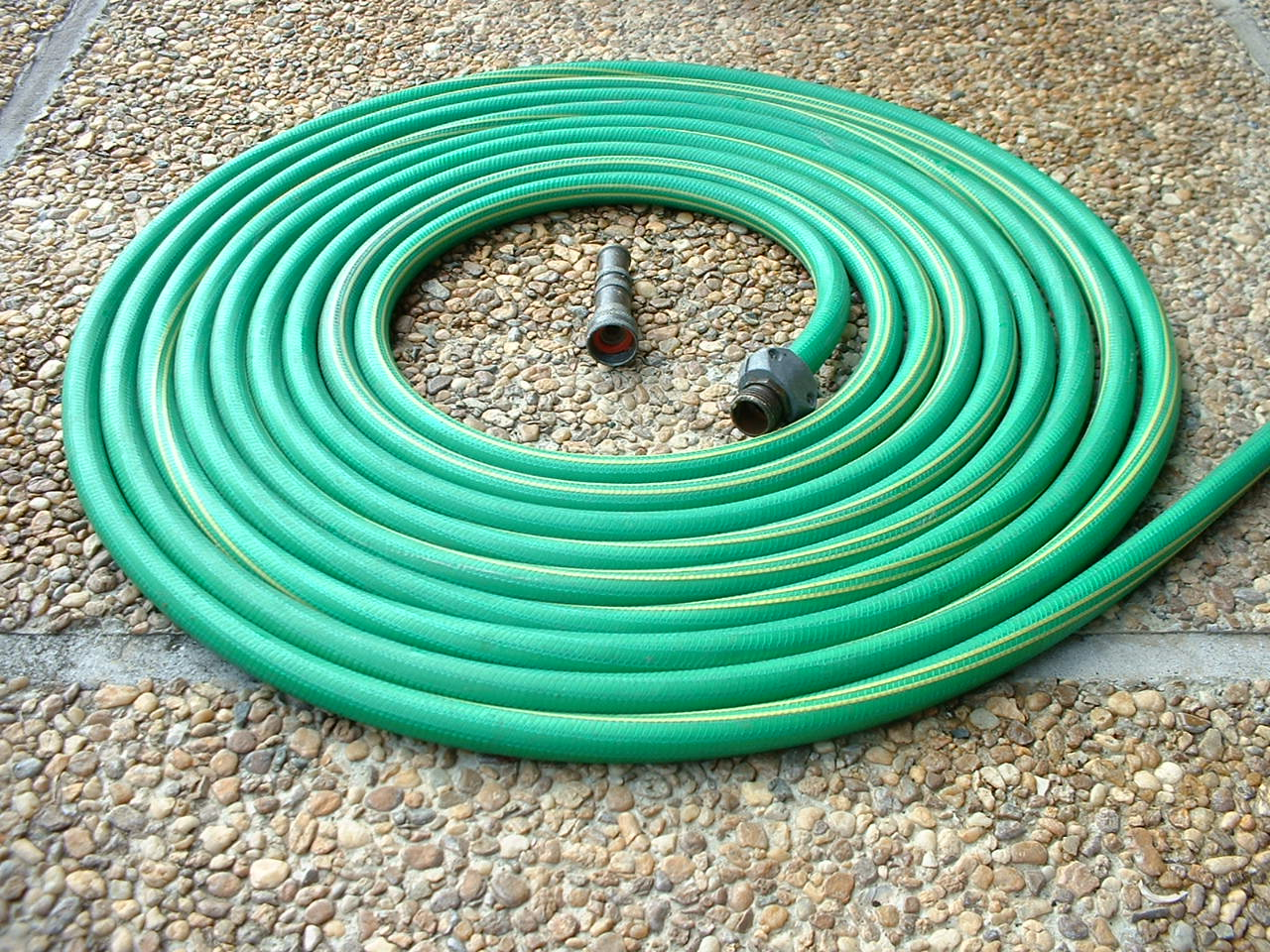
Garden hose

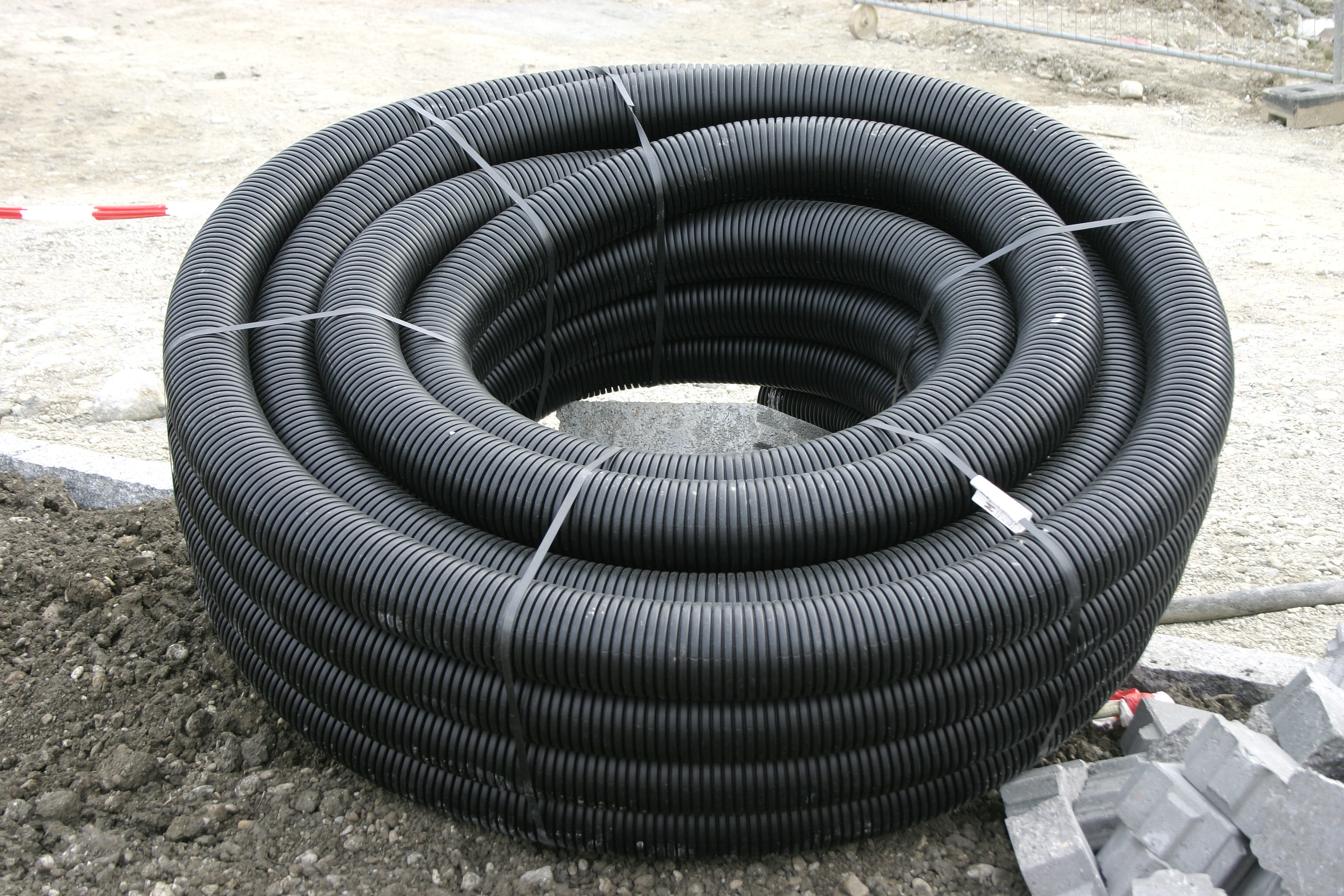
Flexible hose

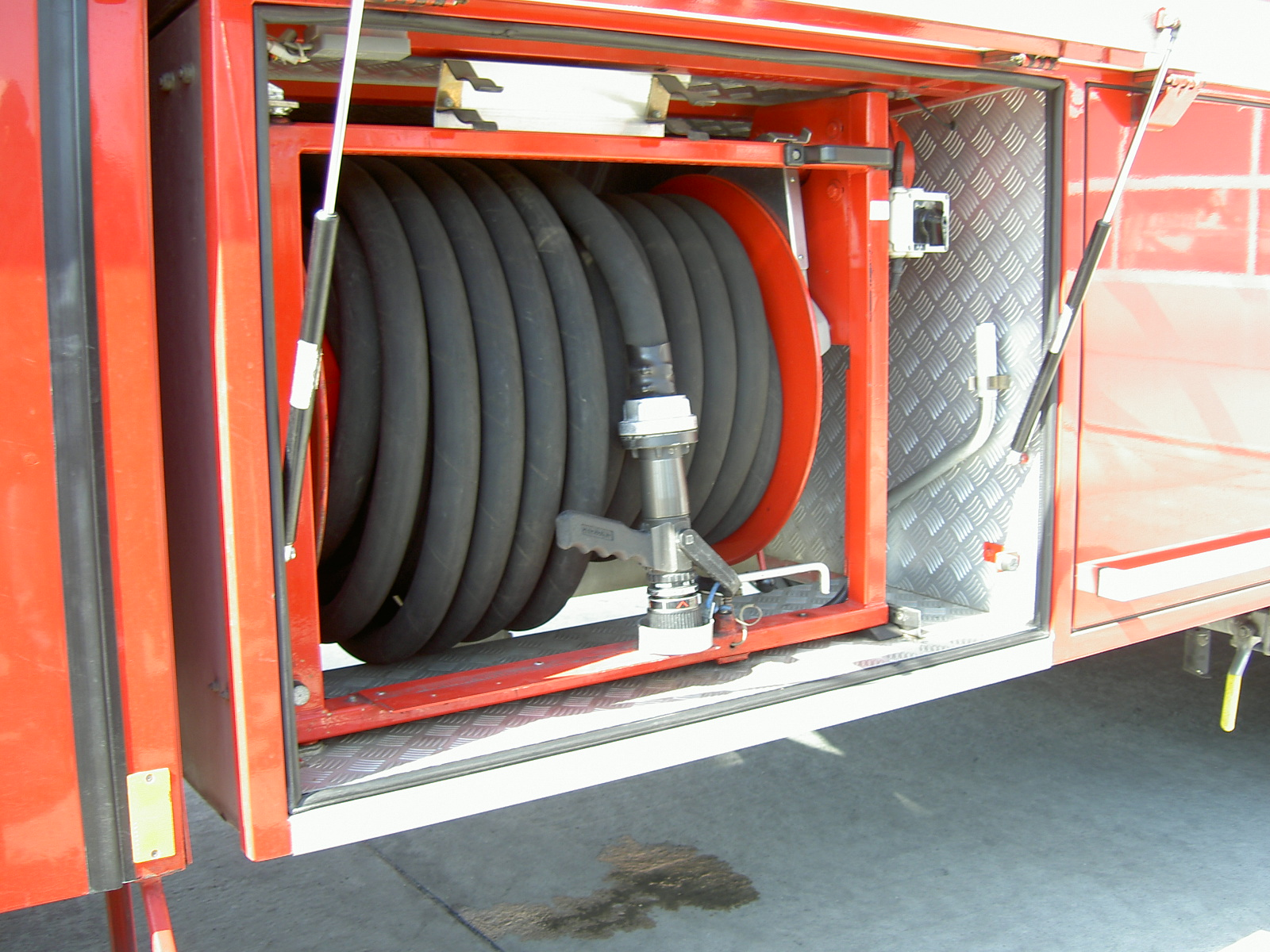
Fire hose

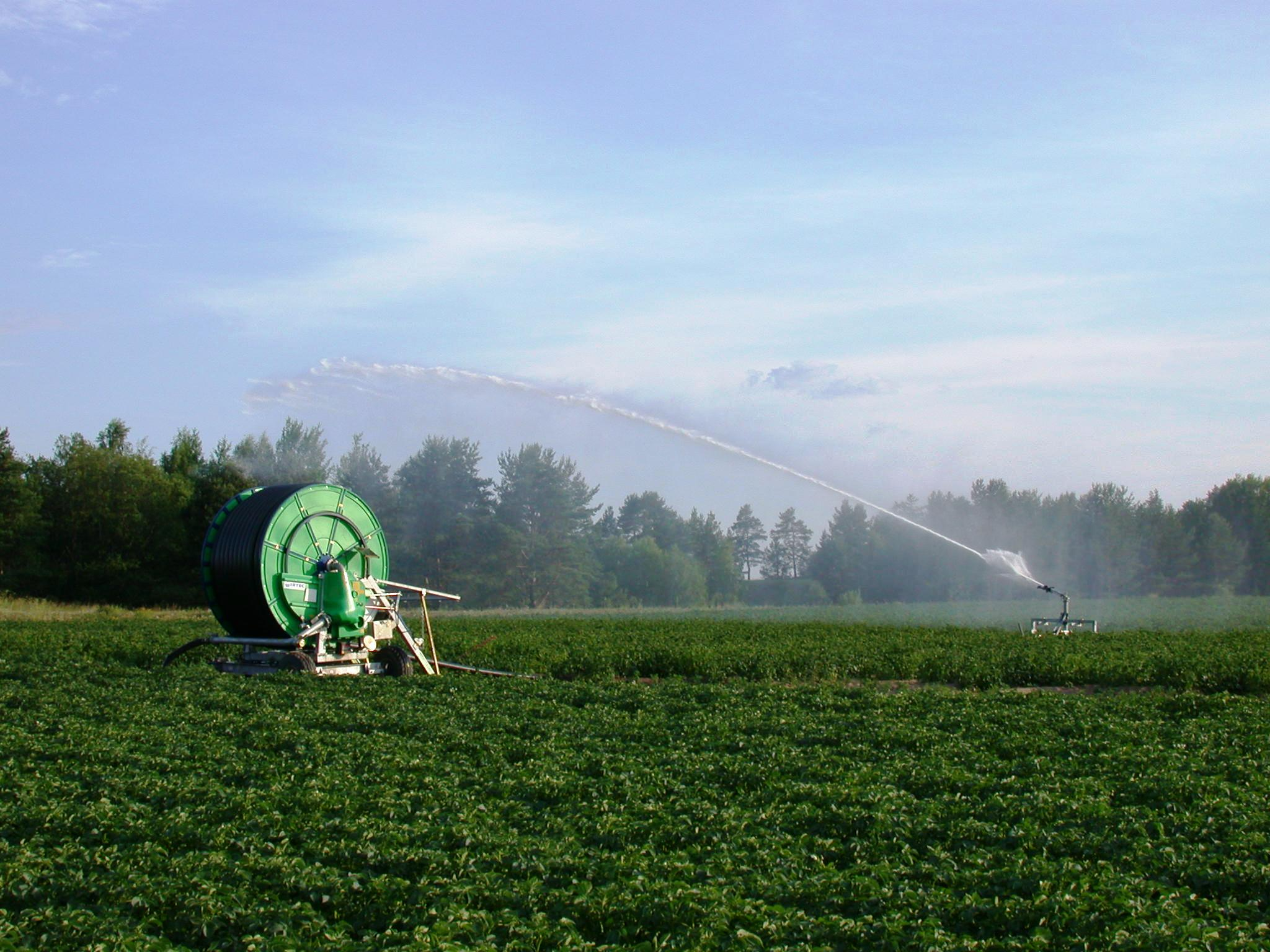
Hose irrigation
