= MBS College of Crete =

- Type: Private
- Established: 1979
- Location: Heraklion, Crete, Greece; 35.3284°N 25.1185°E
- Website: www.collegeofcrete.com

MBS College of Crete is an accredited private college in Heraklion, Crete, Greece. Established in 1979, it provides bachelor's and master's degrees of Nottingham Trent University, Staffordshire University and the University of London International Programmes.

MBS College has been an official partner of Nottingham Trent University since 1998, and of Staffordshire University since 2012. It is accredited by the British Accreditation Council, the Intergovernmental Accreditation Agency, and its graduates are recognised by UK NARIC. Its programmes are linked with professional bodies like the Association of Chartered Certified Accountants, the Chartered Institute of Management Accountants, the British Psychological Society, and the Chartered Institute of Marketing.

The degree programs offered by the college include BA (Hons) in business management, accounting and finance, and interior architecture and design; BSc (Hons) in psychological science; LLB; MBA; and MA education management.
