= Micro Bill Systems =

MicroBillSys

Malware details
- Classification: Potentially Unwanted Application
- Authors: Micro Bill Systems

Technical details
- Discontinued: 2009

Micro Bill Systems, also known as MicroBillSys, MBS and Platte Media, is an online collection service with offices in Leeds, England, considered to be malware. The company states that it is a professional billing company offering "software management solutions that can aid your business in reducing uncollectable payments." The company's best-known clients are online gambling and pornography sites offering three-day free trials of their subscription-based services. If users do not cancel during the trial period, the MBS software begins a repeating cycle of full-screen pop-up windows warning users that their account is overdue and demanding payment.

The eleven-page MBS end-user license agreement contains a clause stating that unless the bill is paid, the software will disrupt computer use longer each day, with up to four daily periods of 10 minutes when the pop-up payment demand is locked and cannot be closed or minimized. Users have complained about the unexpected bills, feel victimized, and deny ever accessing the video sites they are being billed for. MBS denies installing its software by stealthy means and says that the software is downloaded by consent. Many consumers are unaware that they have agreed to the download.

Security software company Symantec describes MicroBillSys as a potentially unwanted application that uses aggressive billing and collection techniques to demand payment after a three-day trial period, and says that there are reports of these techniques leaving the computer unable to browse the Internet.

== Operation ==
When a user first accesses an online service whose collections are managed by MBS, the sign-up software creates a unique identifier based on the user's computer configuration and IP address. This identifier permits MBS to maintain a history of user access to supported sites and to send billing notices directly to the user's computer without the consumer ever having entered a name, credit card number, or other personal information.

The billing notices take the form of repeating pop-up windows warning users that their account is overdue and demanding payment for a 30-day subscription. Typical amounts are £19.95 (US$35.00) or £29.95 (US$52.50). The pop-ups cover a substantial area of the screen and often cannot be closed, effectively preventing use of the computer for up to ten minutes. Their number and frequency increases over time, and to stop them consumers must pay. According to the company's terms and conditions, the agreement can be canceled and the software uninstalled only when no balance is outstanding.

For some who don't pay, Platte sends letters addressed to "the computer owner" threatening legal action in small claims court. The letters, described by one recipient as a "sham county court notice", include a "pre submission" information form which could mislead the unwary into thinking it comes from "Issuing Court Northampton County Court". It is unclear how Platte derives street addresses from IP addresses for these mailings, as ISPs interviewed deny providing such information. By filling out the information form and returning it, users provide Platte with their full name in addition to their correct mailing address. Similarly, users who complain to Platte by email or telephone are asked for their names and addresses so that uninstall codes can be mailed out. Payment demands follow. Later Platte began using a debt collection agency to try to pressurise people into making payments. In these cases, a charge is added to the 'subscription'.

== MBS clients ==
MBS's initial clients were two adult content web sites. After being acquired by Platte Media (Platte International) in early 2008, the company expanded to include the promise of access to Hollywood movies from Getfilmsnow. Film studios Warner Bros. and 20th Century Fox have sent Getfilmsnow a cease and desist order, and say they have not licensed the films Platte is advertising.

While Platte's website presents the company as a mainstream media distribution company, an interview on the Radio Four programme You and Yours with ex-managing director of MBS, Ashley Bateup, indicates that the bulk of the full videos on the site are either black and white, or of a pornographic nature.

== Consumer complaints ==
The UK's Office of Fair Trading (OFT), charged with promoting and protecting consumer interests in the UK, received numerous complaints about the pop-up payment demands from consumers who said they had not realized they were agreeing to be billed. A number of them stated that the pop-up software had been downloaded without the computer having been used to access an MBS client site. The OFT said it was acting in the interests of those consumers whose access to MBS sites was confirmed, but it had no legal jurisdiction to deal with the issue of software being downloaded without consent.

== MBS position ==
MBS denies installing its software by stealthy means, and says that the software is downloaded by consent when users visit an MBS client site. A malware researcher at computer security company Prevx found no evidence of surreptitious installations. A journalist investigating the complaints called the installation process "unmistakable", with "a download, clicking through screens, and entering a four-digit number." Among the required steps is acceptance of an eleven-page end-user license agreement that includes the clause:

If You choose to ignore the payment reminders and do not pay the Membership Fee, You hereby understand and acknowledge that the prompt reminders may become more frequent and that You may lose the ability to use Your computer until You have submitted payment. The payment reminders will be active while your computer is online or offline.

The company says that when it looks into complaints, usually a member of the household has downloaded the software without reading the terms and conditions, and once the billing pop-ups begin they refuse to admit their use to the computer owner. The owner then assumes that the computer is somehow infected. The company says "Our customer service team's experience is that people seem to move into denial with their spouses or partners when pornography use is at question."

The software is difficult for non-technical users to remove, due in part to its use of mutually protective executable files. The company says that if the software were easy to remove, many people would not pay for the services already consumed.

== Undertakings ==
In response to the complaints, the Office of Fair Trading reviewed the MBS sign-up process and the fairness of its terms and conditions. On 27 March 2008, the OFT announced MBS/Platte Media "undertakings", or pledges, to make the sign-up process more fair and setting limits on the amount of disruption the pop-up payment demands could cause.

The company promised to make clear in the sign-up process that the customer is entering into a contract, and that billing pop-ups will appear after the trial period ends. They also promised "to provide information about how consumers can have the 'pop-up' generating software uninstalled at any time".

The company promised to not cause more than 20 pop-ups, to not cause more than one pop-up in any 24-hour period, and to not cause pop-ups "beyond the expiry of six weeks after payment has become due". They also promised to not cause more than ten locked-open pop-ups, and to not cause locked-open pop-ups to remain locked for more than 60 seconds. Payment demands delivered as other than pop-up windows are not restricted.

== Statements by authorities ==
In announcing the MBS undertakings, the Office of Fair Trading's Head of Consumer Protection said "We believe that [the undertakings] achieve the right balance between protecting consumer interests without stifling innovation in the 'on-line' market place."

A local authority in the locale of the MBS Leeds office charged with preventing exploitation of vulnerable consumers, the West Yorkshire Trading Standards, has received hundreds of complaints about the pop-ups. A spokesman for the authority said "It is our opinion at this time that the company is operating within the bounds of existing legislation and as such it would be difficult to take any formal legal action against them."

One woman whose family computer was caught up in the pop-up cycle was interviewed in The Guardian. She wonders, if the company's activities are indeed legitimate as maintained by West Yorkshire Trading Standards, why hasn't pressure been put on the Office of Fair Trading to tighten up the law?

== Shutdown in the UK ==
On 9 March 2009, and following a protracted letterwriting campaign conducted by the Platte/MBS Victims Forum Martin Horwood MP raised a question in the House of Commons about the activities of Platte and specifically about the number of complaints that had been received by the OFT and Trading Standards about its activities. In response, he was informed that Platte had ceased trading in the UK with effect from 25 February 2009. No specific reason was given for this withdrawal, but it is fair to assume that the continued resistance by British consumers to what they regarded as an unfair business model must have played a part in its decision, along with the threat of action by HM Revenue concerning possible non-payment of VAT. In an email to Michael Pollitt, the company said it had stopped operating in the UK, and that "Our reasons for this decision and our further intentions are simply related to our original marketing and business model", adding: "Obviously, and just like any other business should and would do, I am making sure that stopping our marketing to the UK Market, is done in such a sensible and orderly manner, that will best preserve the interests of our customers and of our own."

== See also ==
- Movieland — a similar business operating in the USA
- Ransomware — a malware program that prevents access to files and/or computer unless paid.
