= David Allais =

American expert and inventor (born 1933)

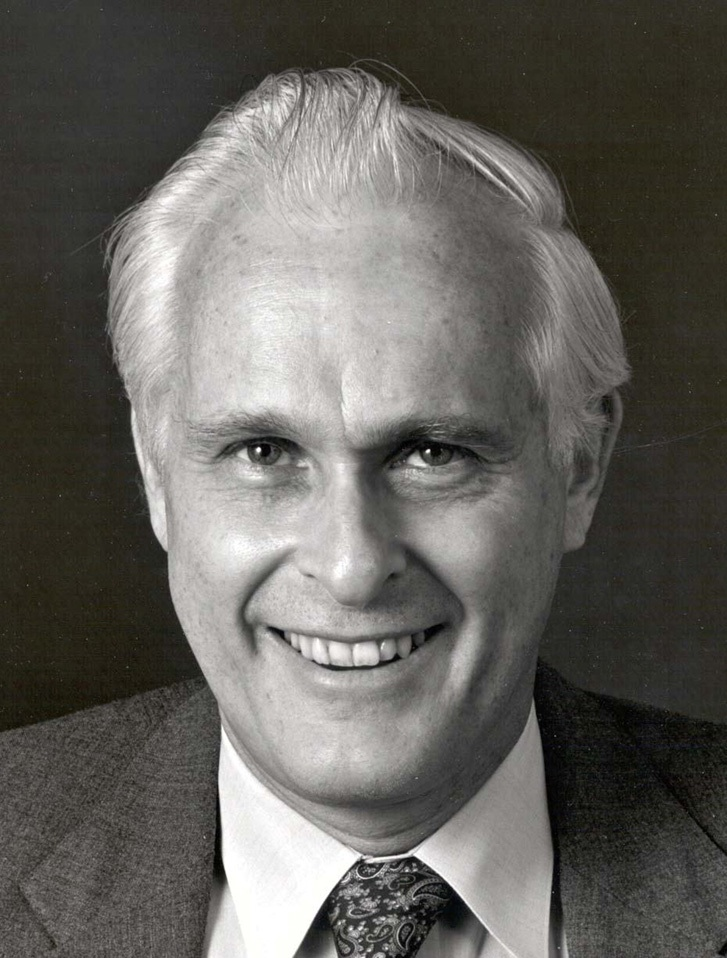
- Born: March 5, 1933 (age 93); Chicago, Illinois, U.S.
- Education: University of Arizona, Stanford University
- Occupations: Inventor, Chairman of PathGuide Technologies, Former Chief executive officer of Intermec Inc.

David Allais (born March 5, 1933) is an American expert and inventor in the fields of bar coding and automatic identification and data capture. As vice president and later president and chief executive officer of Everett, Washington-based Intermec Inc. (NYSE:IN), he built the company from a small startup into the leading manufacturer of bar code and printing equipment. Prior to Allais' role at Intermec, he served as a manager for IBM. Most recently, Allais founded PathGuide Technologies, a Bothell, Washington-based developer of warehouse management systems for distributors.

== Education and accolades ==
Allais received a Bachelor of Science degree in mechanical engineering in 1954. He received a Master of Science degree in mechanical engineering from the University of Arizona in 1958 and a Master of Science degree in electrical engineering from Stanford University in 1962. In 1965, Allais received a doctor of philosophy degree from Stanford University. In 1988, Allais was awarded the Association for Automatic Identification and Mobility (AIM) Richard R. Dilling Award as a preeminent contributor to bar code technology and on October 16, 2009, Allais received the University of Arizona College of Engineering Lifetime Achievement Award.

== Inventions and patents ==
Allais is credited with creating five bar code symbologies: Code 39, Interleaved 2 of 5 (ITF), Code 11, Code 93 and Code 49. He is also named inventor on the following seven U.S. patents:

- U.S. patent 3,001,369, Hydraulic System for Driving Several Actuators, 1962, Assigned to IBM.
- U.S. patent 3,067,333, Motion Control Apparatus, Assigned to IBM.
- U.S. patent 3,670,145, Tape Feed System, 1972, Assigned to Intermec Corporation.
- U.S. patent 3,784,794, Electro-Optical Reader for Bar Codes, 1974, Assigned to National Bank Of Commerce of Seattle.
- U.S. patent 3,844,210, Multi-Color (bar code) Printer, 1974, Assigned to Intermec Corporation.
- U.S. patent 3,909,594, Circuit for Establishing a Reference Voltage in Bar Code Readers, 1975, Assigned to Intermec Corporation.
- U.S. patent 4,794,239, Multi-Track Bar Code (Code 49), 1988, Assigned to Intermec Corporation.

=== Interleaved 2 of 5 ===
Allais developed Interleaved 2 of 5 in 1972 while at Intermec. It is a numeric only barcode used to encode pairs of numbers into a self-checking, high-density barcode format. The first digit is encoded in the five bars (or black lines), while the second digit is encoded in the five spaces (or white lines) interleaved with them. Two out of every five bars or spaces are wide (therefore 2 of 5). Applications include labeling corrugated shipping containers and identifying casino tickets.

=== Code 39 ===
In 1974, Allais and Ray Stevens, both at Intermec at the time, developed Code 39. Code 39 is a barcode symbology that can encode uppercase letters (A through Z), digits (0 through 9) and a handful of special characters like the $ sign. Code 39 is broadly used particularly in the automobile industry and manufacturing.

=== Code 11 ===
Code 11 is a barcode symbology developed by Allais while at Intermec in 1977. In 1977 Intermec's printing and reading technology limited the density of Code 39 to 9.4 characters per inch. For numeric applications, Codabar provided somewhat higher density (12 characters per inch). However, at the time, Intermec was contractually obligated to sell Codabar printers only to Monarch Marking Systems. Interleaved 2 of 5 was not a discrete symbology and thus could not be printed at a high enough density by our drum printers. It is used primarily in telecommunications. The symbol can encode any length string consisting of the digits 0-9 and the dash character (-).

=== Code 93 ===
Code 93 is a barcode symbology developed by Allais in 1982 while at Intermec to provide a higher density and data security enhancement to Code 39. It is an alphanumeric, variable length symbology. Code 93 is designed to encode 26 upper case letters, 10 digits and 7 special characters:

A, B, C, D, E, F, G, H, I, J, K, L, M, N, O, P, Q, R, S, T, U, V, W, X, Y, Z
0, 1, 2, 3, 4, 5, 6, 7, 8, 9
-, ., $, /, +, %, SPACE.

=== Code 49 ===
In 1987 Allais, while at Intermec, developed Code 49 as the next evolution in bar code symbology to solve scanning large amounts of data on small objects. Although the practical uses of Code 49 would be limited, it set the stage for the later development of PDF417, a stacked linear bar code symbol that is widely used.

== Career ==
After receiving his Master of Science degree in mechanical engineering from the University of Arizona in 1958, Allais went on to serve in various engineering and engineering management positions at IBM in both California and New York state from 1958 to 1968.

In 1968, Allais was hired as the vice president of engineering by then Interface Mechanisms, now Intermec. From 1968 to 1988, he served in a number of executive management roles at Intermec as executive vice president, president & chief executive officer, chairman & chief executive officer, and chief scientist. 14 of those years at Intermec were spent as chief executive officer.

In 1989, Allais founded PathGuide Technologies and served as its president until 2006. PathGuide, formerly Applied Tactical Systems of Washington, develops, markets, and implements real time warehouse management systems and time and attendance systems. PathGuide's warehouse management systems make extensive use of bar code scanning and RF data communications. Allais currently serves as chairman of PathGuide.

== Associations ==
- GS1 consultant member since 1974
- AIDC 100 charter member and president
- WERC (Warehouseing Education and Research Council) member
