= Key Ring (software) =

Smartphone application

Key Ring App
- Company type: Subsidiary
- Industry: Digital Media
- Founded: 2008
- Founder: Chris Fagan
- Headquarters: Dallas, TX
- Owner: Gannett, Inc.
- Website: keyringapp.com

Key Ring is a smartphone application owned by Gannett, Inc. that allows users to digitally store loyalty cards, enroll in new loyalty programs, receive localized offers on their smartphone, browse weekly sales circulars, and create digital shopping lists.

== Overview ==
The mobile application was developed by Mobestream Media, a company headquartered in Dallas, Texas, in 2008.

On February 11, 2011, Key Ring received 1.75 million dollars in Series A funding from Austin Ventures, a venture capital and growth equity firm based in Texas.

In September 2012, the company was acquired by Gannett Inc (GCI) for an undisclosed price. The company operates under the G/O Digital, the digital marketing division of Gannett. Other divisions under G/O Digital include PointRoll, BLINQ Media, Deal Chicken, GannettLocal and Shoplocal.

Key Ring has been mentioned in media outlets such as The Today Show, Time Magazine, Fox Business, The New York Times, Wall Street Journal, Entrepreneur Magazine, Oprah.com, and The Los Angeles Times.

== Features ==
The mobile application supports the following barcode types: EAN13, EAN8, UPC-A, UPCE, ITF, Code128, Code128C, Code39, Code128A, CODABAR, CODABAR2, CODABAR1, QR code

Cards are stored by either scanning the barcode on the back of the card or manually typing in the UPC number. The app alerts users when one of the loyalty programs they are a member of has an offer or coupon available. Rewards points earned by the user are kept track of within the loyalty card feature as well. Users can share loyalty and membership cards with other users as long as they are registered in Key Ring. Weekly Sales Circulars are digitized, allowing users to view what they would normally find in a newspaper on their smartphone.
