= Robert Moon =

Robert Moon may refer to:

- Robert Oswald Moon (1865–1953), British physician, writer and Liberal Party politician
- Robert Moon (postal inspector) (1917–2001), considered the father of the ZIP Code
- Robert Charles Moon (1844–1914), ophthalmologist
- Robert James Moon (1911–1989), American physicist, chemist and engineer
