= Postbar =

Postbar, PostBar, or postbar may refer to:

- Baidu Tieba, also known as Baidu Postbar
- PostBar, a blank-ink barcode system used by Canada Post
