= PathGuide Technologies =

- Type: Private
- Industry: Warehouse Management System
- Founded: Lynnwood, Washington (1989)
- Headquarters: 22745 29th Drive SE, Suite 150, Bothell, WA 98021, United States, Bothell, Washington
- Key people: David Allais, Eric Allais
- Products: Latitude Warehouse Management System, Latitude Manifest System, Advanced VMI
- Website: http://www.pathguide.com

PathGuide Technologies is a privately held software company based in Washington State that develops, markets and implements real time warehouse management systems (WMS). It's largely known as the company that Dr. David Allais, an expert and inventor in the fields of bar coding and automatic identification and data capture (AIDC), founded. PathGuide’s main product, Latitude Warehouse Management System, makes use of bar code scanning and RF data communications. The company integrates its products with Enterprise Resource Planning (ERP) and Automatic Identification and Data Capture companies like Microsoft, Oracle and Intermec. PathGuide primarily markets to wholesale/industrial distributors.

== History ==
David Allais founded PathGuide, then Applied Tactical Systems, in 1989 in Lynnwood, Washington.

In 2000, the company changed names to PathGuide Technologies and moved to Mukilteo, Washington. David Allais’ son, Eric, became CEO in 2006 after serving as the company’s vice president of marketing since 1999.

In 2009, on PathGuide’s 20th anniversary of being in business, the company reported record revenue and cash flow.

== Products and services ==
The company offers three major products, Latitude (WMS), Latitude Manifest & Shipping System (LMS) and Advanced VMI (VMI).

=== Latitude Warehouse Management System (WMS) ===
Latitude WMS is a software suite that automates warehousing and distribution to provide real-time online information about inventory. It automates all operations from receiving and order picking to manifesting to truck route/stop management, and integrates with major ERP business systems such as SAP, Microsoft Dynamics, Oracle, JD Edwards, Epicor, Infor, and others. Customers are primarily industrial/wholesale distributors serving manufacturers, contractors and retail stores, Synq Solutions, Becker Electric Supply and E.B. Horsman & Son.

== Industry Recognition ==
- – 2009 Supply & Demand Chain Executive Pros to Know
- – 2008 Supply & Demand Chain Executive Pros to Know
- – 2008 Supply & Demand Chain Executive 100
- – 2008 Supply Chain Brain 100 Great Supply Chain Partners
