= Unova =

Unova or UNOVA may refer to:

- Unova region, a fictional Pokémon setting
- Intermec, previously UNOVA, inc.
