= STID =

STID may refer to:

- Service type identifier, a three-digit value in the data payload of an Intelligent Mail barcode
- Star Trek Into Darkness, a 2013 American science fiction action film
