= Cleanmail =

CleanMail may refer to:

- RM4SCC a barcode symbology used by the Royal Mail
- CleanMail Antispam an antispam filter software from Alinto, available in freeware and commercial editions.
