= Postal Alpha Numeric Encoding Technique =

Type of barcode

Value	Encoding
1	┃┃┃╻╻
2	┃┃╻┃╻
3	┃┃╻╻┃
4	┃╻┃┃╻
5	┃╻┃╻┃
6	┃╻╻┃┃
7	╻┃┃┃╻
8	╻┃┃╻┃
9	╻┃╻┃┃
0	╻╻┃┃┃

The Postal Alpha Numeric Encoding Technique (PLANET) barcode was used by the United States Postal Service to identify and track pieces of mail during delivery – the Post Office's "CONFIRM" services. It was fully superseded by Intelligent Mail Barcode by January 28, 2013.

== Barcode ==
A PLANET barcode appears either 12 or 14 digits long. The barcode:

- identifies mailpiece class and shape
- identifies the Confirm Subscriber ID
- includes up to 6 digits of additional information that the Confirm subscriber chose, such as a mailing number, mailing campaign ID or customer ID
- ends with a check digit

== Encoding ==
Like POSTNET, PLANET encodes the data in half- and full-height bars. Also like POSTNET, PLANET always starts and ends with a full bar (often called a guard rail), and each individual digit is represented by a set of five bars using a two-out-of-five code. However, in POSTNET, the two bars are full bars; in PLANET, the two-of-five are the short bars. As with POSTNET, the check digit is calculated by summing the other characters and calculating the single digit which, when added to the sum, makes the total divisible by 10.
