= Delivery point =

Location where mail is delivered

In a postal system, a delivery point (sometimes DP) is a single mailbox or other place at which mail is delivered. It differs from a street address, in that each address may have several delivery points, such as an apartment, office department, or other room. Such buildings (primarily residential) are often called multiple-dwelling units (MDUs) by the USPS.

== United States Postal Service usage ==
In the US Postal System, a delivery point is a specific set of digits between 00 and 99 assigned to every address. When combined with the ZIP + 4 code, the delivery point provides a unique identifier for every deliverable address served by the USPS.

The delivery point digits are almost never printed on mail in human-readable form; instead they are encoded in the POSTNET delivery point barcode (DPBC) or as part of the newer Intelligent Mail Barcode (IMb). The DPBC makes automated mail sorting possible, including ordering the mail according to how the carrier delivers it (walk sequence).

The two-digit delivery point number is combined with an additional check digit in the DPBC. This digit is used by barcode sorters (BCS) to check if the ZIP, ZIP+4, or delivery point ZIP codes contain an error. In a database, storing the ZIP+4 code in a 10 character field (with the hyphen) allows easy output in the address block, and storing the check digit in a 3-digit field (instead of calculating it) allows automatic checking of the validity of the ZIP+4 and delivery point fields in case one had been changed independently. In order to receive the appropriate barcode discount, the delivery point digits and the +4 extension must be verified using an up-to-date, CASS or Delivery Point Validation (DPV) certified program.

Since each city block or section of a rural route has a different +4 extension, and address numbers generally increase by 100 per block, the delivery point is typically the last two digits of the address. In the early days of DPBC, it was acceptable to determine the delivery point in this fashion, but since suite and other secondary designations are assigned unique delivery points which cannot be determined without the CASS/DPV database, this is no longer possible. The delivery point is usually redundant for post office boxes, since they are typically assigned their own ZIP+4 code, but must nonetheless be assigned a complete DPBC for full postal discounts. The full rules for identifying the delivery point for a given address are specified in the USPS CASS Technical Guide.

== United Kingdom ==
In the United Kingdom the delivery point index is known as the Postcode Address File (PAF). It is owned and made available by Royal Mail.

== New Zealand Post ==
New Zealand Post maintains an index of delivery points known as the National Postal Address Database (NPAD).

== Australia Post ==
In Australia the PAF is maintained by Australia Post.

== See also ==
- Coding Accuracy Support System
