= D. Jamison Cain =

American government official (1926–2010)

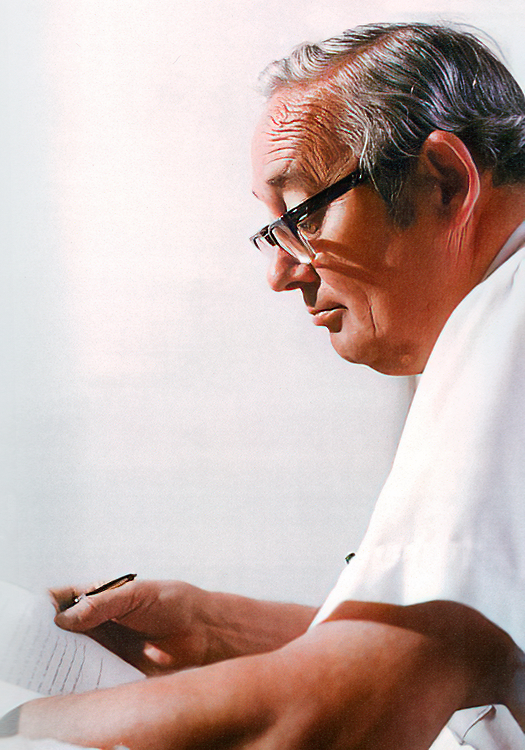
- Portrait of Cain, c. 1980
- Born: David Jamison Cain Jr. January 1, 1926; Sumter, South Carolina, U.S.
- Died: April 12, 2010 (aged 84); Arlington, Virginia, U.S.
- Resting place: Columbia Gardens Cemetery; Arlington, Virginia, U.S.
- Occupations: Newspaperman; government official; writer
- Known for: coining the phrase "ZIP code" and developing the mascot Mr. ZIP
- Military career
- Branch: United States Army
- Conflicts: World War II

David Jamison Cain Jr. (January 1, 1926 – April 12, 2010) was a United States Postal Service employee known for coining the phrase "ZIP code" for the Zone Improvement Plan initiated by the Postal Service in 1963. He also helped develop the Postal Service mascot Mr. ZIP. He was instrumental in developing marketing campaigns in the 1960s to make the ZIP code the universal letter mailing paradigm in the United States.

== Early life ==
David Jamison Cain Jr. was born on January 1, 1926, in Sumter, South Carolina to Mary Ellen "Molly" (née Bowman) and David Jamison "Jimmie" Cain. His father served in World War I and was a banker with the National Bank of South Carolina. He attended Edmunds High School and the St. Bernard Preparatory School and College in Cullman, Alabama, majoring in liberal arts. He served in the United States Army during World War II.

== Career ==
Cain worked for The State, a newspaper in Columbia, South Carolina. He also worked for the Charleston Evening Post and The Camden Chronicle. From 1955 to 1960, Cain worked as the Washington bureau chief for Sims News Bureau, a group that covered news from Washington, D.C. for about 40 newspapers, radio and television stations in Florida, Georgia and South Carolina.

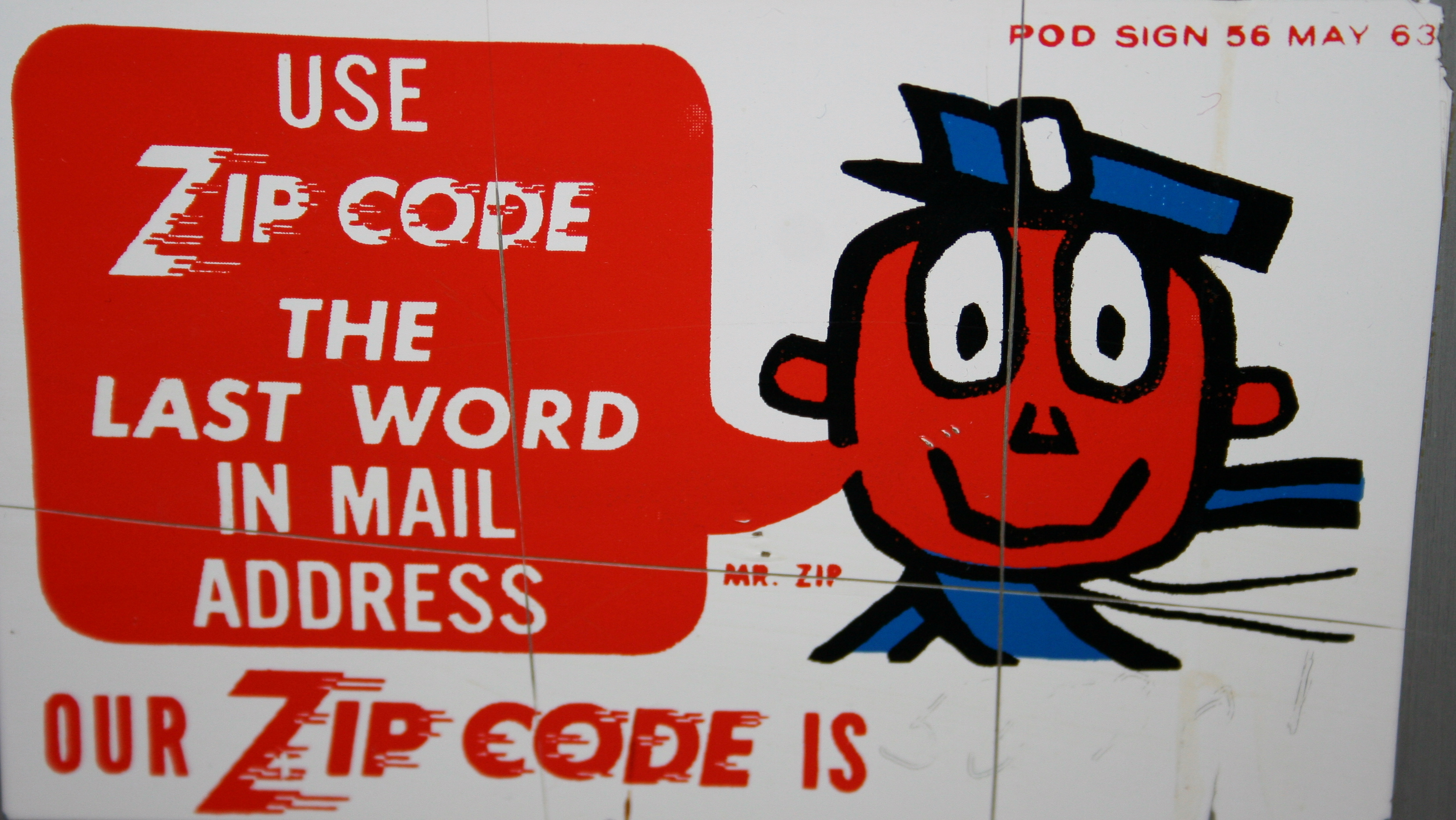
Advertisement for Mr. ZIP in May 1963

In March 1961, Cain was appointed by President John F. Kennedy as deputy special assistant to the Postmaster General for public affairs, working under Postmaster General J. Edward Day. In that role, Cain was known for coining the term "ZIP code" to describe the United States Postal Service five-digit Zone Improvement Plan. He was instrumental in devising and implementing the marketing campaign in 1962 that brought the ZIP code into universal use and created the mascot Mr. ZIP. The ZIP code was introduced on July 1, 1963. Cain used his home address, "3374 N. Dinwiddie St., Arlington, VA 22207", as the return address for Mr. ZIP in the sample letter used in the commercial for the ZIP code. The house was a simple two-story brick Colonial house. In April 1963, he purchased life-size cutouts of Mr. ZIP for postmasters across the country and copyrighted the Disney song "Zip-a-Dee-Doo-Dah" so the lyrics could be rewritten to promote the ZIP code. Mr. ZIP would be used by the Postal Service until 1983, when it was officially retired. By 1983, Cain was the director of public affairs at the Postal Service.

Cain later worked in support of the Postal Reorganization Act of 1970, which transformed the Post Office Department from a cabinet-level agency to the United States Postal Service, a state-owned enterprise.

Cain served in the board of directors in 1964 for the South Carolina State Society in Washington. He received a meritorious service award from the Postal Service on July 18, 1967, for "developing promotion programs", including one for the ZIP code. Cain wrote the book Beauty and Wit, a collection of poems, with W. G. Kennedy and Mary Ellen B. Cain in 1983. Cain wrote the book How to Show You Know What You're Talking About! The Speaker's Guide to Illustrative Anecdotes in 2005.

== Personal life ==
Cain moved to Arlington, Virginia in 1959.

Cain married Arleen Jennie Iverson of Jamestown, North Dakota on March 30, 1957, in Washington, D.C. She was the secretary of U.S. Congressman Usher L. Burdick and later an executive secretary for several Northern Virginia businesses. She died in 1999 from cancer. They had three sons: Andrew, David "Jimmie" and Paul. Andrew Cain is a politics editor with the Richmond Times-Dispatch.

Cain died on April 12, 2010, in Arlington. He was buried at Columbia Gardens Cemetery in Arlington.
