= Robert Moon (postal inspector) =

Robert Aurand Moon (April 15, 1917, Williamsport, Pennsylvania, US – April 10, 2001, Leesburg, Florida, US), sometimes called "Mr. ZIP", is known as the father of the ZIP Code, or "Zone Improvement Plan", introduced by the United States Post Office Department in 1963.

== Biography ==
On April 15, 1917, Moon was born in Williamsport, Pennsylvania. Following his mother's death when he was young, Moon's father, a grocer, went bankrupt during the Great Depression. He went on to earn a scholarship to Duke University but could not afford to enroll because he failed to get a job nearby. He started working for the postal service, and despite initial intentions to transfer to an office near Duke, he moved back to Pennsylvania because he was homesick.

=== Development of ZIP codes ===
In 1940, Moon began developing an idea to streamline mail. He first submitted it in 1944, while working as a postal inspector in Philadelphia. According to his plan, each mail parcel would be routed to one of several hundred regional sorting facilities that corresponded to a three-digit code in the address.

As the postal service handled huge new volumes of mail, it was increasingly using jet transport and trucking instead of previous rail and ship routes, which disrupted previous sorting mechanisms and caused a bottleneck in mail service as staff sorted the mail by hand. No longer able to leisurely hand sorting mail as passenger trains traveled between town centers, postal workers required a method for high speed machine sorting to handle the increased volume of mail.

=== Introduction of ZIP codes and later career ===
After repeatedly submitting the concept for nearly two decades, a 1962 postal service committee took on the idea and further developed it, adding two additional digits to allow for even more specific delivery areas. Five-digit ZIP codes were introduced on July 1, 1963. A widespread information campaign introduced a "Mr. ZIP" mascot, originally created by an advertising art director named Harold Wilcox whose father was a postman. The cartoon mailman character was promoted extensively, including on postal delivery vehicles, with local "Miss Zip Code" beauty pageants across the nation, and in a Post Office-sponsored television special featuring rock and roll ZIP code-themed music by the "Swingin' Six". In 1963, the first Directory of Post Offices using five-digit ZIP code numbers was published.

Moon retired in 1965, but returned to the postal service five years later to serve as national director of delivery services in Washington, D.C.

== Personal life ==
Moon was passionate about the future of air transport and was an amateur pilot. He and his wife, Barbara Moon, lived in an estimated 25 cities over the course of Moon's postal career. Although Barbara wore a necklace engraved with "Mrs. ZIP" that he gave her, she did not remember the ZIP codes from any of their previous addresses.

In 2001, Moon died in Leesburg, Florida, where he lived in a nursing home. His obituary noted that had a vision of "ZIP codes for interplanetary mail".

== See also ==
- ZIP Code
- D. Jamison Cain
