= Coding Accuracy Support System =

System for correcting US postal addresses

- Developer: United States Postal Service (USPS)
- Release: 1987; 39 years ago
- License: Proprietary standard
- Website: postalpro.usps.com/certifications/cass

The Coding Accuracy Support System (CASS) enables the United States Postal Service (USPS) to evaluate the accuracy of software that corrects and matches street addresses. CASS certification is offered to all mailers, service bureaus, and software vendors that would like the USPS to evaluate the quality of their address-matching software and improve the accuracy of their ZIP+4, carrier route, and five-digit coding.

For software vendors and service bureaus, CASS Certification must be renewed annually with the USPS to meet current CASS Certification cycle requirements.

CASS Certified products are listed in USPS literature and on its web site. CASS software will correct and standardize addresses. It will also add missing address information, such as ZIP codes, cities, and states to ensure the address is complete. Starting with 2007 Cycle L, CASS software will also perform delivery point validation to verify whether or not an address is a deliverable address and check against the USPS Locatable Address Conversion System to update addresses that have been renamed or renumbered.

A correct address saves the Postal Service time, money and manpower by reducing the volume of:

1. Non-deliverable mail
2. Unsorted mail
3. Mail that is deliverable, but requires extra effort to determine the proper location to which it should be delivered.

Mailers who use CASS software to check the addresses of their mailing may be able to qualify for discounted postage rates from the USPS.

As an example of what CASS software will correct in an address, an input of:

1 MICROWSOFT
REDMUND WA

Produces the output of:

1 MICROSOFT WAY
REDMOND WA 98052-8300

Here the street and city name misspellings have been corrected (MICROWSOFT → MICROSOFT; REDMUND → REDMOND); street suffix (WAY), ZIP code and ZIP+4 add-on have been added; and, in this case, the address was determined to be the location of a business.

In addition to an updated address, CASS software can also return descriptive information about the address. The information falls into two categories:

1. If the address was successfully processed, or if not then why,
2. Information on how to deliver the mailing.
