= Code 93 =

Barcode symbology

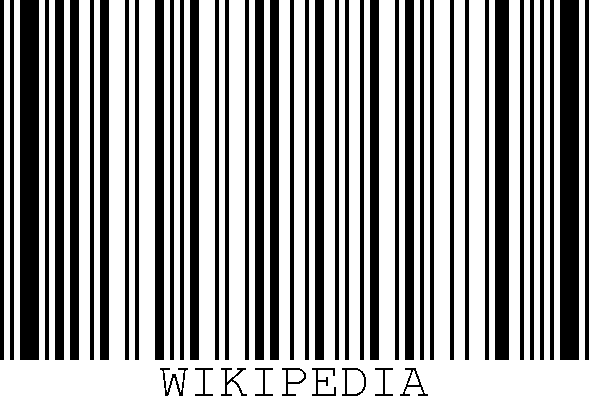
"WIKIPEDIA" encoded in Code 93

Code 93 is a barcode symbology designed in 1982 by Intermec to provide a higher density and data security enhancement to Code 39. It is an alphanumeric, variable length symbology. Code 93 is used primarily by Canada Post to encode supplementary delivery information. Every symbol includes two check characters.

Each Code 93 character is nine modules wide, and always has three bars and three spaces, thus the name. Each bar and space is from 1 to 4 modules wide. (For comparison, a Code 39 character consists of five bars and four spaces, three of which are wide, for a total width of 13–16 modules.)

Code 93 is designed to encode the same 26 upper case letters, 10 digits and 7 special characters as code 39:

A B C D E F G H I J K L M N O P Q R S T U V W X Y Z
0 1 2 3 4 5 6 7 8 9
- . $ / + % SPACE

In addition to 43 characters, Code 93 defines 5 special characters (including a start/stop character), which can be combined with other characters to unambiguously represent all 128 ASCII characters.

In an open system, the minimum value of X dimension is 7.5 mils (0.19 mm). The minimum bar height is 15 percent of the symbol length or 0.25 inches (6.4 mm), whichever is greater. The starting and trailing quiet zone should be at least 0.25 inches (6.4 mm).

== Structure of a code 93 barcode ==
A typical code 93 barcode has the following structure:

- A start character *
- Encoded message
- First modulo-47 check character "C"
- Second modulo-47 check character "K"
- Stop character *
- Termination bar

== Detailed outline ==
The 48 possible code-93 symbols are as follows. There are actually $\tbinom 83$ = 56 combinations that satisfy the coding rules, but one would be confused with the stop symbol in reverse, and the other 7 are unused. Codes 43–46 can be prefixed to alphanumeric values to produce all 128 possible ASCII codes. This is done in exactly the same way as Full ASCII Code 39, but uses reserved codes rather than re-using codes 39–42.

Code 93 bar code
ID	Character	Widths	Binary	ID	Character	Widths	Binary
0	0	131112	100010100	28	S	211122	110101100
1	1	111213	101001000	29	T	211221	110100110
2	2	111312	101000100	30	U	221121	110010110
3	3	111411	101000010	31	V	222111	110011010
4	4	121113	100101000	32	W	112122	101101100
5	5	121212	100100100	33	X	112221	101100110
6	6	121311	100100010	34	Y	122121	100110110
7	7	111114	101010000	35	Z	123111	100111010
8	8	131211	100010010	36	-	121131	100101110
9	9	141111	100001010	37	.	311112	111010100
10	A	211113	110101000	38	SPACE	311211	111010010
11	B	211212	110100100	39	$	321111	111001010
12	C	211311	110100010	40	/	112131	101101110
13	D	221112	110010100	41	+	113121	101110110
14	E	221211	110010010	42	%	211131	110101110
15	F	231111	110001010	43	($)	121221	100100110
16	G	112113	101101000	44	(%)	312111	111011010
17	H	112212	101100100	45	(/)	311121	111010110
18	I	112311	101100010	46	(+)	122211	100110010
19	J	122112	100110100	Start/Stop *		111141	101011110
20	K	132111	100011010	(Reverse stop)		114111	101111010
21	L	111123	101011000	Unused		411111	111101010
22	M	111222	101001100	Unused		111132	101011100
23	N	111321	101000110	Unused		111231	101001110
24	O	121122	100101100	Unused		113112	101110100
25	P	131121	100010110	Unused		113211	101110010
26	Q	212112	110110100	Unused		213111	110111010
27	R	212211	110110010	Unused		212121	110110110

== Full ASCII Code 93 ==
Code 93 is restricted to 43 characters and 5 special characters. In Full ASCII Code 93, the 43 basic symbols (0–9, A–Z, "-", ".", "$", "/", "+", "%" and space) are the same as their representations in Code 93. Lower case letters, additional punctuation characters and control characters are represented by sequences of two characters of Code 93.

This encoding is the same as Full ASCII Code 39, except that four special-purpose symbols are used, rather than reassigning $, /, + and %:

Code details
Nr	Character	Encoding	Nr	Character	Encoding	Nr	Character	Encoding	Nr	Character	Encoding
0	NUL	(%)U	32	[space]	[space]	64	@	(%)V	96	`	(%)W
1	SOH	($)A	33	!	(/)A	65	A	A	97	a	(+)A
2	STX	($)B	34	"	(/)B	66	B	B	98	b	(+)B
3	ETX	($)C	35	#	(/)C	67	C	C	99	c	(+)C
4	EOT	($)D	36	$	$	68	D	D	100	d	(+)D
5	ENQ	($)E	37	%	%	69	E	E	101	e	(+)E
6	ACK	($)F	38	&	(/)F	70	F	F	102	f	(+)F
7	BEL	($)G	39	'	(/)G	71	G	G	103	g	(+)G
8	BS	($)H	40	(	(/)H	72	H	H	104	h	(+)H
9	HT	($)I	41	)	(/)I	73	I	I	105	i	(+)I
10	LF	($)J	42	*	(/)J	74	J	J	106	j	(+)J
11	VT	($)K	43	+	+	75	K	K	107	k	(+)K
12	FF	($)L	44	,	(/)L	76	L	L	108	l	(+)L
13	CR	($)M	45	-	-	77	M	M	109	m	(+)M
14	SO	($)N	46	.	.	78	N	N	110	n	(+)N
15	SI	($)O	47	/	/	79	O	O	111	o	(+)O
16	DLE	($)P	48	0	0	80	P	P	112	p	(+)P
17	DC1	($)Q	49	1	1	81	Q	Q	113	q	(+)Q
18	DC2	($)R	50	2	2	82	R	R	114	r	(+)R
19	DC3	($)S	51	3	3	83	S	S	115	s	(+)S
20	DC4	($)T	52	4	4	84	T	T	116	t	(+)T
21	NAK	($)U	53	5	5	85	U	U	117	u	(+)U
22	SYN	($)V	54	6	6	86	V	V	118	v	(+)V
23	ETB	($)W	55	7	7	87	W	W	119	w	(+)W
24	CAN	($)X	56	8	8	88	X	X	120	x	(+)X
25	EM	($)Y	57	9	9	89	Y	Y	121	y	(+)Y
26	SUB	($)Z	58	:	(/)Z	90	Z	Z	122	z	(+)Z
27	ESC	(%)A	59	;	(%)F	91	[	(%)K	123	{	(%)P
28	FS	(%)B	60	<	(%)G	92	\	(%)L	124	|	(%)Q
29	GS	(%)C	61	=	(%)H	93	]	(%)M	125	}	(%)R
30	RS	(%)D	62	>	(%)I	94	^	(%)N	126	~	(%)S
31	US	(%)E	63	?	(%)J	95	_	(%)O	127	DEL	(%)T, (%)X, (%)Y, (%)Z
