= Mr. ZIP =

Mascot of the United States Post Office Department

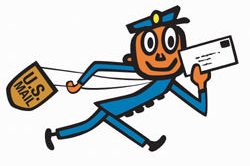
Mr. ZIP.

Mr. ZIP, informally "Zippy", is a cartoon character that was introduced by the United States Post Office Department on July 1, 1963, and later used by its successor, the United States Postal Service, to encourage the use of ZIP Codes. Mr. ZIP was retired in 1986 following the introduction of an updated 9-digit ZIP code system.

== Background ==
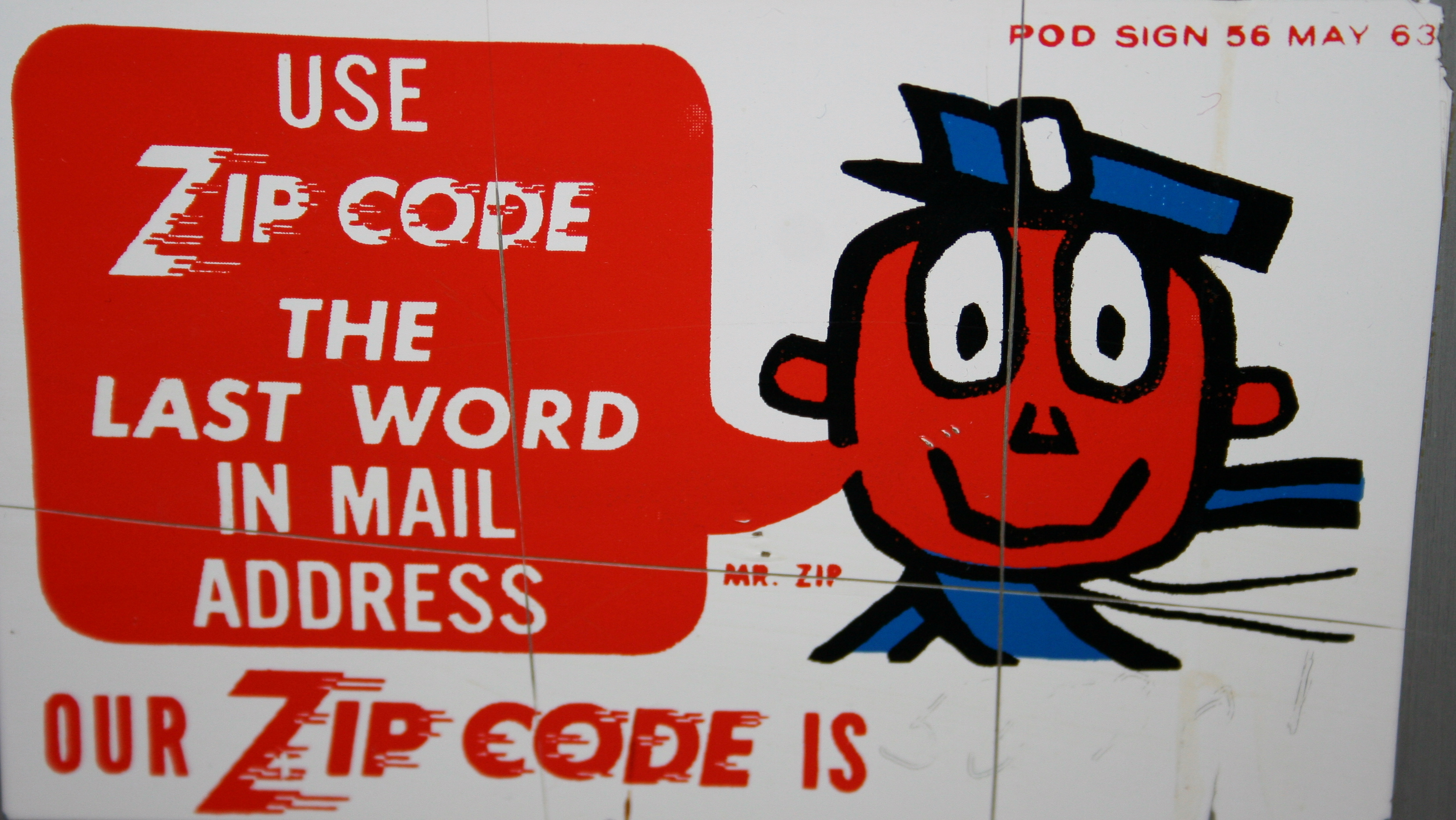
Mr. ZIP on a 1963 sign.

Mr. Zip was based on a 1957 character created by Howard Wilcox, an advertising art director at the agency Cunningham & Walsh, for Chase Manhattan Bank's bank-by-mail campaign. AT&T later acquired the design and gave it to the Post Office Department, which had a staff artist sharpen the character's body and added a mail bag. Mr. ZIP was revealed in October 1962 at a postmasters convention in Pittsburgh, and was rolled out publicly for the introduction of ZIP codes on July 1, 1963.

=== Description ===
Mr. ZIP is a caricature of a mail carrier, wide-eyed and drawn with his letter bag trailing him in such a way as to imply his traveling at extreme speed. He sometimes holds onto his hat with his free hand, and his limbs are quite thin, almost like those of a stick figure. His skin is vibrantly orange, his clothing and accessories are blue, and smaller details such as his eyes are white, aside from the cap badge, which is sometimes colored yellow.

Mr. ZIP has no middle name. He was initially planned to be called "Mr. P.O. Zone", but was renamed Mr. ZIP to match the name of the Zone Improvement Plan ("ZIP") program.

== Post Office mascot campaign ==
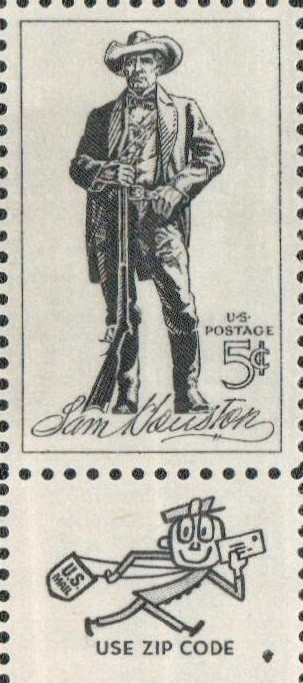
A stamp with Mr. ZIP in 1964.

Mr. ZIP was promoted extensively. An internal document form the Post Office reads, "We fully expect Mr. Zip to become as familiar a figure as the Agriculture Department’s Smokey Bear." A Mr. ZIP board game was sold, as were a Mr. ZIP Thermos and Mr. ZIP lunchbox. He was featured on the side of postal delivery vehicles, on the inside cover of stamp booklets, and on the selvage (edges) of stamp sheets beginning with the 5 cent Sam Houston stamp, issued January 10, 1964 (the corner block of four stamps from these sheets are saved as "ZIP blocks" by stamp collectors). A 4.5-foot tall plywood Mr. ZIP was displayed in post office lobbies, with a button that could be pressed to play a ZIP-themed song by Ethel Merman: "Zip-a-Dee-Doo-Dah, Zip-a-Dee-Day; send your mail out the five digit way". The Mr. ZIP figure at one post office was stolen in broad daylight as an intruder alarm sounded, prompting a deputy U.S. Marshal to threaten a criminal search. By the next morning the figure had been returned, presumably smuggled back in overnight.

Mr. ZIP was featured prominently in a comic strip, an advertisement with the famous singer and harmonica player Johnny Puleo, and in a televised musical special with the folk-rock band the "Swingin' Six" band that was written by Irve Tunick. In the largest single mailing in history, the Post Office delivered flyers explaining the new codes to all 72 million mailing addresses in the country.

A televised special from the post office to promote the ZIP Code, featuring the Swingin' Six

"Meet the fellow called Mr. ZIP.
What he can do for you will make you really flip!
So if you have any further postal demands,
we're gonna leave you in his hands."

– lyrics from Mr. ZIP television special

=== Miss (or Mrs.) Zip ===
In some promotions and situations, female counterparts of Mr. ZIP appeared. President Lyndon Johnson declared the first "National ZIP Code Week" from October 10–15, 1966, and nationwide festivities included local "Miss ZIP Code" beauty pageants held across the country, with a final nationwide contest in Puerto Rico. In 1966, New York City's Miss Zip Code renamed Manhattan's Eighth Avenue to "Zip Code Ave"

Postmaster J. Edward Day named Ethel Merman "Miss ZIP Code". Robert Moon, the postal inspector largely responsible for introducing ZIP codes, gave his wife an engraved necklace that said "Mrs. ZIP".

=== Reception ===
Four years after Mr. ZIP's debut, about 80% of Americans recognized the character.

Shortly after its debut, some Texas mailmen expressed that they were upset by the juvenile cartoonish portrayal of them. The Texas letter carriers association asserted that Mr. ZIP "looks like a simpleton" and is "disrespectful and degrading" to postal workers in a complaint to the U.S. Post Office. Others, however, felt Mr. ZIP was "just a sprightly little figure".

=== Legacy ===
The character was largely phased out by the late 1970s, but the Postal Service retained rights to the copyrighted figure. Mr. ZIP appeared in the blank selvage of United States stamps until January 1986. The Postal Service re-introduced Mr. ZIP to stamps in 2013, celebrating the 50th anniversary of the ZIP Code system.

In November 2024, an animated Mr. ZIP made a guest appearance in a holiday special on the children's show Blippi, ahead of the February 2025 launch of "Mail with Mr. ZIP", a YouTube series produced by Blippi owner Moonbug Entertainment aimed at teaching young children about the Postal Service.

== Purpose of ZIP codes ==
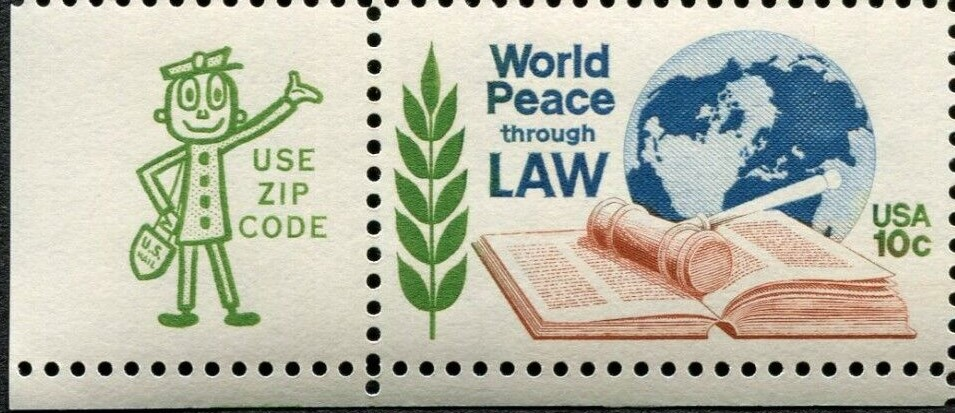
Mr. ZIP attached to a 1975 stamp.

Mr. ZIP was a public information campaign from the Post Office Department, supported by national telephone companies, which had been switching to 10 digit phone numbers around the same time. Mass mailers generally included the postal code because the Post Office required it for preferential mailing rates, but compliance was lower among the general public, particularly older people. This caused inconvenience and delays for the Post Office, which were required to deliver all First Class mail that was possible.
