= Intermec =

American electronics manufacturing company

Intermec, Inc.
- Type: Public
- Traded as: NYSE: IN
- Industry: AIDC
- Founded: 1966; 60 years ago in Mountlake Terrace, Washington, United States
- Defunct: December 2012; 13 years ago
- Fate: Acquired by Honeywell
- Headquarters: Everett, Washington, United States
- Key people: John Waldron (president of Honeywell Scanning & Mobility)
- Products: Barcode readers, wireless networking, mobile computers, RFID
- Website: www.honeywellaidc.com

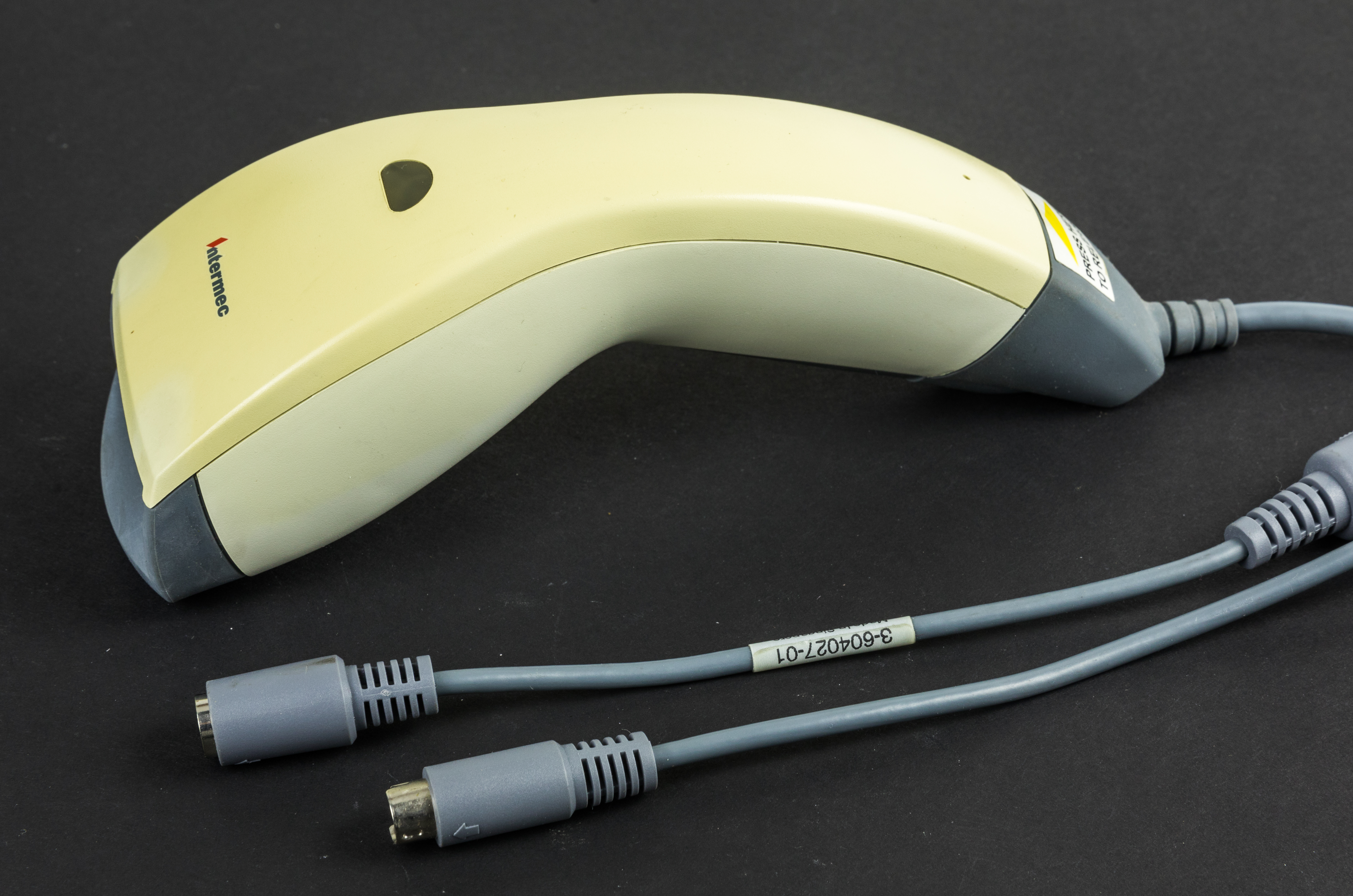
Barcode scanner Intermec Scanplus 1800 SR

Intermec, Inc. was a manufacturer and supplier of automated identification and data capture equipment, including barcode scanners, barcode printers, mobile computers, RFID systems, voice recognition systems, and life cycle services.

Intermec held patents in RFID (Radio Frequency Identification) and customers include 75 percent of Fortune 500 companies and 60 percent of Fortune 100 companies. Intermec was traded on the New York Stock Exchange.

On December 10, 2012, Intermec announced it agreed to be acquired by Honeywell International Inc. in an all-cash transaction valued at approximately $600 million. The Merger was approved by Intermec's stockholders on March 19, 2013 and received regulatory approval from the European Commission on June 14, 2013. FTC clearance was announced on September 13, 2013.

In 2013, Honeywell announced the acquisition of Intermec. Intermec was integrated with Honeywell Scanning & Mobility, within the Honeywell Automation and Control Solutions (ACS) business.

== Products ==
The majority of Intermec's business came from automating supply chain operations in manufacturing, warehouse and distribution, retail, transportation and logistics, direct store delivery and field service sectors. Their product lines included:

- RFID (Radio Frequency Identification) readers, printers, tags and labels
- Barcode scanners, Barcode printers and Media
- Mobile computers
- Wireless networks
- Software Tools and Utilities
- Voice recognition hardware systems and software
- Lifecycle Services

In 2000, Intermec produced the exotic Intermec 6651 clamshell Handheld PC, with unusual features including a PC card slot, camera, modem, and VGA output.

== Corporate timeline ==
- 1966 – Interface Mechanisms formed
- 1982 – Company renamed Intermec Corporation
- 1991 – Acquired by Litton Industries, Inc. (NYSE:LIT)
- 1994 – Ownership transferred to Western Atlas Inc. (NYSE:WAI), a Litton spin-off
- 1997 – Ownership transferred to UNOVA, Inc. (NYSE:UNA), a Western Atlas spin-off
- 1997 – Acquired Norand and UBI (United Barcode Industries)
- 1997 – Acquired radio frequency identification (RFID) semiconductor technology from IBM, Inc.
- 1998 – Acquired Amtech Corporation's high-frequency RFID business, Amtech Transportation Systems
- 2006 – UNOVA, Inc. becomes Intermec, Inc., retaining Intermec Technologies as subsidiary
- 2011 - Acquired private voice technology company Vocollect Inc. and life cycle services company Enterprise Mobile
- 2013 - Acquired by Honeywell, now part of Honeywell Scanning and Mobility
