= Semacode =

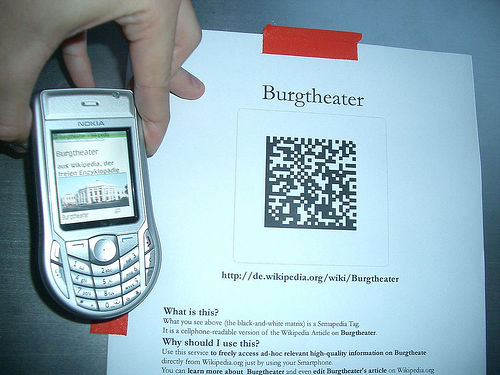
Semacode used for accessing Wikipedia in the form of Semapedia.

Semacode was a software company based in Waterloo, Ontario, Canada, known for a product with the same trade name – machine-readable ISO/IEC 16022 Data Matrix barcodes, which are used to encode Internet URLs.

Semacodes were primarily aimed at being used with cellular phones which have built-in cameras, to quickly capture a Web site address for use in the phone's web browser. The system was created by Simon Woodside after he was thinking of a follow up to the use of CueCat barcode scanners. When it launched it operated only on Nokia camera phones that use the Symbian Series 60 operating system.

The Semacode website states that Semacode tags are an "open system" and that tag creation is "completely unrestricted," with the SDK software tools being free of charge for non-commercial use.

Suggestions for usage from the Semacode.org website included 2007:

- placing Semacode tags on posters, such as those for concerts and public performances. Those interested could use their mobile phone to take a photo of the tag, which could link them directly to the web page where they could order tickets.
- using Semacode tags and mobile phones to enable multilingual museum exhibits—a tag photographed at the exhibition entrance could set a language cookie in the phone's web browser, and subsequent Semacode tags displayed at each exhibit could then link the phone's browser directly to a web page about the item, displayed in the user's language of choice.
- placing Semacode tags on name tags given to conference attendees. These tags could provide the corporate web address of each attendee's company, or their biography and contact details.

== See also ==
- QR Code an implementation of a similar concept invented in Japan.
- PDF417
- Object hyperlinking
- High Capacity Color Barcode
- SPARQCode
- Cauzin Softstrip an historical implementation of a similar concept introduced in the 1980s
