= Payanywhere =

Payments platform and app

- Company type: Private
- Industry: Mobile Payments
- Founded: January 2011
- Founder: Marc Gardner
- Headquarters: Troy, Michigan
- Area served: United States
- Website: www.payanywhere.com

Payanywhere is a payments platform and app that allows merchants in the United States to accept credit and debit card payments while building customer relationships in-store, online, or on the go. Merchants may accept payments on their smartphone via a Bluetooth card reader or on an in-store “Storefront” solution featuring a tablet and stand, which was introduced on April 8, 2014. PayAnywhere offers credit card readers and apps that are compatible with both Apple and Android devices.

Announced in late August 2015, a new Payanywhere reader for iOS phones and tablets added Apple Pay support, as well as NFC, EMV and magnetic stripe acceptance. It was available exclusively from Apple’s retail and online store(s). Android tablet support was added in early October of that year.

A key feature of the solution platform beyond payment acceptance is Payanywhere Inside, an online merchant portal that enables businesses to access reporting, manage employee permissions, accept phone and online payments via a virtual terminal, send and manage invoices, take action on chargebacks, and access additional business management tools.

== History ==
North (payment processing company) developed the Payanywhere app internally. Payanywhere officially launched in January 2011 on the iOS platform. In May 2011, Payanywhere made its app available for Android devices. Payanywhere launched an app for BlackBerry smartphones in May 2012, supporting BlackBerry models OS 4.7 or later.

In June 2012, Payanywhere released its Android SDK to complement its iOS SDK, which was made available in December 2011. The SDKs, available in Basic and Advanced, allow developers to embed credit card processing functionality into their own apps.

Payanywhere Storefront, a tablet and stand designed for retail payment acceptance, was launched in April 2014.

In August 2015, Payanywhere introduced a new version of its Payanywhere mobile credit card reader that would accept both EMV chip card and Apple Pay transactions. Then, in October of that same year, Payanywhere began offering the only mobile NFC reader on the market that accepted Apple Pay, Android Pay, and Samsung Pay.

In September 2017, Payanywhere became the first payment processor to offer Bluetooth EMV credit card readers without a monthly fee. As of December 2017, Payanywhere users are able to use a camera or barcode scanner to accept Alipay through both the mobile app and Payanywhere Storefront.

== Overview ==
Payanywhere’s payments platform allows merchants to accept credit and debit card payments on a smartphone or tablet (Storefront) while also enabling them to view reporting, send and receive invoices, accept online payments through a virtual terminal, and manage employees, customers, and inventory. Merchants may accept traditional magstriped credit and debit cards, along with EMV chip cards, and NFC payments like ApplePay – all with next-day funding, access to Payanywhere Inside, a secure, online merchant portal, and live customer and technical support.

== Business model ==
Payanywhere offers Standard (as low as 1.69% per swipe), Pay-As-You-Go (as low as 2.69% per swipe) and Custom pricing models. Up-to-date versions of the app can be downloaded, at no cost, in the App Store and Google Play. Merchants can accept Visa, MasterCard, Discover, and American Express credit and debit cards. As of December 2015, Payanywhere charges inactivity fees for idle accounts; otherwise they claim there are no monthly fees or cancellation fees.

The Payanywhere platform also includes security features like data encryption, tokenization, and fraud protection. Additionally, in-app and online reporting provide small and medium-sized business owners with analysis tools. Users can monitor their daily sales, create inventories and generate customized reports of all sales activity in real time. This enables users to track sales immediately or over the long term and evaluate sales based on time of day, week or month to assess inventory orders and product promotions.

== Features ==
Payanywhere offers the following features:

- Accept credit and cash transactions in store or on-the-go.
- Accept magstripe, EMV chip cards, and contactless payments like Apple Pay, Android Pay, and Samsung Pay
- Three different pricing plans
- Invoicing and dispute management tools
- Access to in-depth reports in-app and online
- Employee and customer management
- Online payment acceptance via a virtual terminal
- PCI-compliant equipment
- Custom discounts, tips, and tax by location
- Emailable receipts
- Cash drawer and printer connectivity and QuickBooks integration
- Access to SDKs, APIs, code samples, test accounts, hosted ecommerce solutions, and PC-based middleware
- Live customer support through live chat, phone, and email
- Access to Payanywhere Inside, a secure, online merchant portal

== Retail ==
At CTIA Wireless 2012, Payanywhere announced its intention to expand into the retail channel, making its mobile payment solution available in stores and online from retailers nationwide.

In November 2012, the company announced its nationwide retail rollout was live. Nationwide retailers include Walmart, OfficeMax and The Home Depot. Specialty retailers include Pep Boys and Hastings. Regional retailers include Fred Meyer and Meijer. Payanywhere is also available for purchase online at Walmart, OfficeMax, and Amazon.com.

== Awards and reception ==
PayAnywhere was a finalist for the Emerging Technology (E-Tech) Awards under the Mobile Applications: Mobile Commerce, Shopping & Rewards category.

Black Enterprise named PayAnywhere the “Most Dynamic Mobile App” at the 2012 Black Enterprise Best in Show Awards at CTIA Wireless 2012.

J.P. Morgan analyst Tien-tsin Huang commented that “being born out of a top merchant processor gives PayAnywhere an advantage in understanding the complex needs of businesses looking to accept card-based payments.”

In a mobile payment roundup, Eric Geier of PCWorld advised “PayAnywhere’s system is a good choice if you’re looking for a simple processor or even a POS-like system that supports cash drawers and can print receipts.”

Jessica Dolcourt of CNET reviewed PayAnywhere at CTIA Wireless 2012 and said “Payanywhere is taking swipes at Square’s credit card reader with a strong offering of its own and national distribution.”
