= Barcode Scanner (application) =

Android app

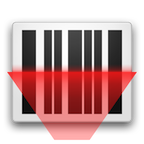
- Developers: Sean Owen, Daniel Switkin, ZXing Team
- Initial release: 1 March 2008
- Stable release: 4.7.8 / 11 September 2018; 7 years ago
- Written in: Java
- Operating system: Android
- License: Apache License 2.0
- Website: Main site Google Play
- Repository: github.com/zxing/zxing

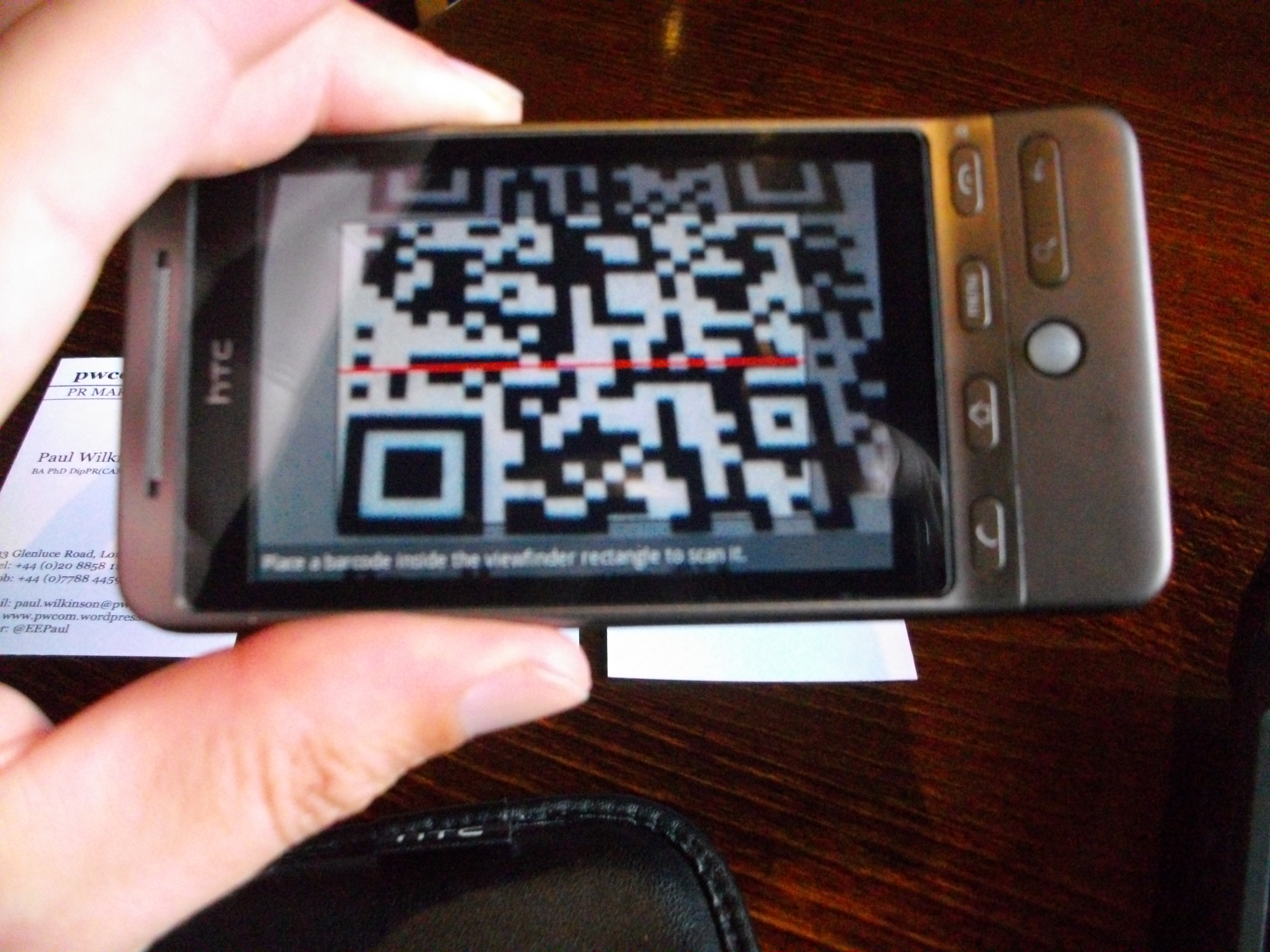
Barcode Scanner scanning a QR code

The application Barcode Scanner is an Android app, from the open-source project ZXing (short for Zebra Crossing), that allows an Android device with imaging hardware (a built-in camera) to scan barcodes or 2D barcodes and retrieve the data encoded. Information encoded often includes web addresses, geographical coordinates, and small pieces of text, in addition to commercial product codes. This Android-based system has similar functionality to a hardware barcode reader.

This application supports many different types of barcodes, including those used to identify products in commerce. The Barcode Scanner can automatically search the Web to identify a product with a barcode and use, for example, price-comparison information between vendors.

The application can decode several 2D barcodes including the widely used QR Code and Data Matrix. QR codes are often embedded in websites; Barcode Scanner can open a browser at the encoded site, for example, facilitating the download of an application.

As of May 2016, this is one of the most downloaded Android applications as listed by Google Play, with over 600,000 ratings and over 126 million user installs.

Detection performance of ZXing was assessed on close to 2 million synthetic images for three types of barcodes: QR Code, MaxiCode, and EAN-13 1D barcode. Problematic angles where decoding often fails were found, for example 45, 135, 225 and 315 degrees for QR Codes.

== See also ==
- Automated identification and data capture (AIDC)
- Barcode printer
- Code (disambiguation)
- European Article Numbering-Uniform Code Council
- Global Trade Item Number
- Identifier
- Inventory control system
- List of most downloaded Android applications
- Object hyperlinking
- Semacode
- SMS barcode
- SPARQCode
