= Mobile tagging =

Reading data from tags on mobile devices

Mobile tagging is the process of providing data read from tags for display on mobile devices, commonly encoded in a two-dimensional barcode, using the camera of a camera phone as the reader device. The contents of the tag code is usually a URL for information addressed and accessible through Internet.

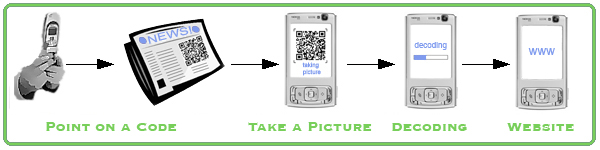
the mobile tagging process

== History ==
Mobile tagging is currently most prominent in Asia, especially Japan. It was developed in 2003 and ever since it has been used in several fields of mobile marketing. Denso's QR Code

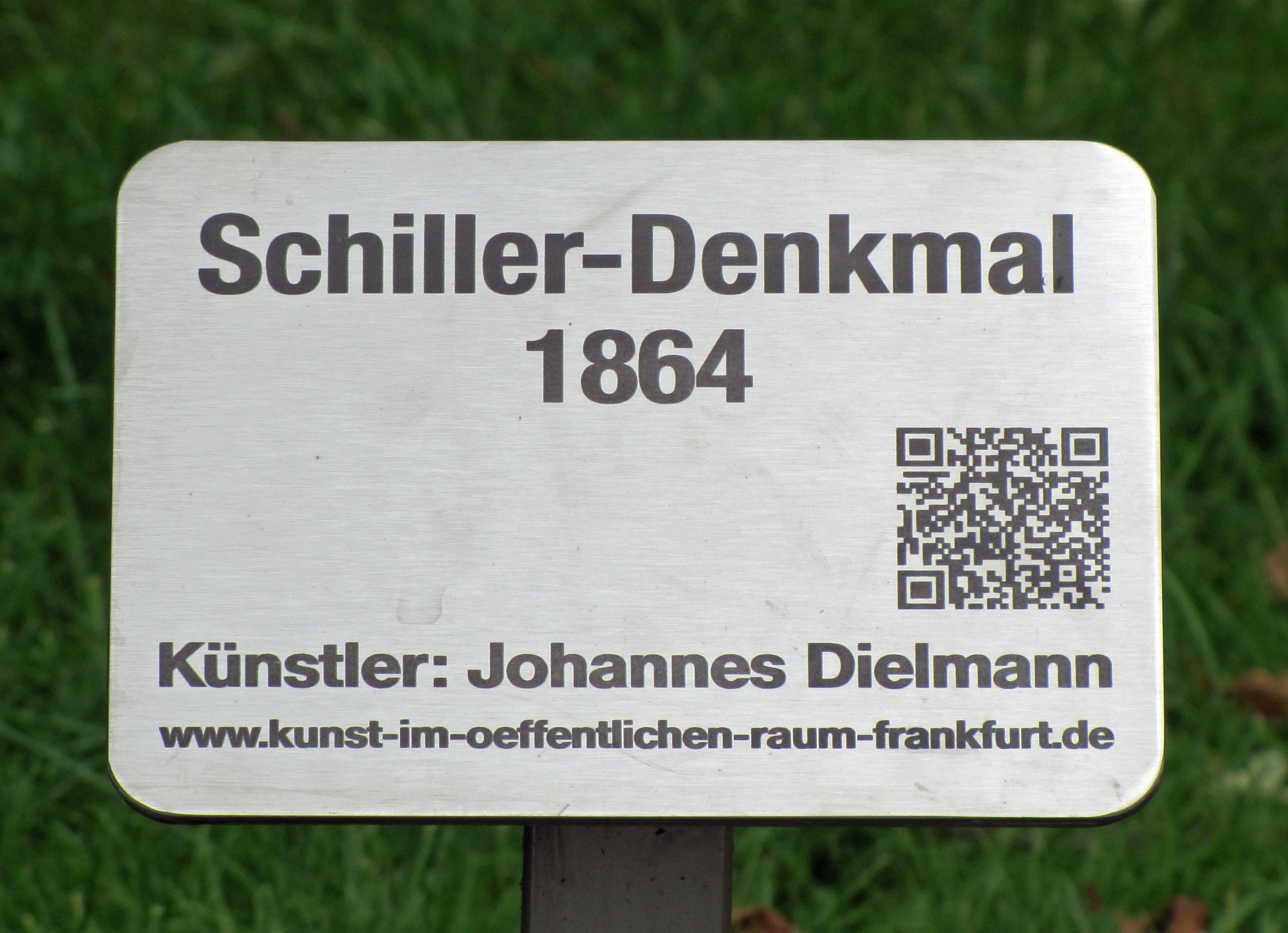
QR code on memorial information sign (here: Schiller memorial). A pilot project by the Kulturamt Ffm for the internet portal www.kunst-im-oeffialen-raum-frankfurt.de. The QR code corresponds to the text "www.kunst-in-ffm.de/mobile/obj298.html".

in Asia and the Data Matrix are currently the most popular 2D barcodes. Both are ISO-standardised. In 2009, prominent electronics company Microsoft introduced the Microsoft Tag format, based on the company's self-developed High Capacity Color Barcode (HCCB) standard, in an effort to establish the format through emerging mobile tagging markets in the west. Unlike most popular 2D barcodes, which use black-and-white square pixels, HCCBs are based on colors in a triangle-based arrangement.

The reason for the success of mobile tagging, besides the flexible and multiple fields of application, is the quick, precise and customer-driven access to information. According to the principle of physical world connection (see also Object hyperlinking), the user is able to gather digital information immediately by scanning a two-dimensional barcode, like one on an advertisement.

In Europe mobile tagging is now gaining traction, albeit that the primary usage has been direct linking of URLs to 2D codes. Indeed, several campaigns in relation to physical world connection have been launched, however a standard for multi-dimensional barcodes is still missing.

One of the key organizations driving wider implementation of two-dimensional barcodes is GS1 / GS1's main activity is the development of the GS1 System, a series of standards designed to improve supply chain management. The GS1 System is composed of four key product areas: Barcodes (used to automatically identify things), eCom (electronic business messaging allowing automatic electronic transmission of data), GDSN (Global Data Synchronisation Network which allows partners to have consistent item data in their systems at the same time) and EPCglobal (which uses RFID technology to immediately track an item).

== Codes and readers ==
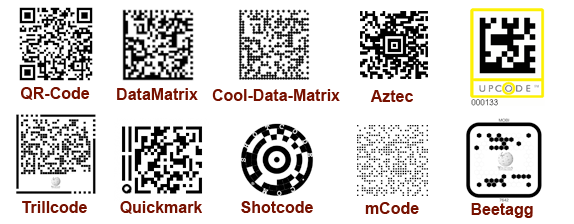
Overview of several mobile-tagging codes. Certain codes can be 'stacked' i.e. 4 DataMatrix codes are stacked together increasing the amount of data contained within the code.

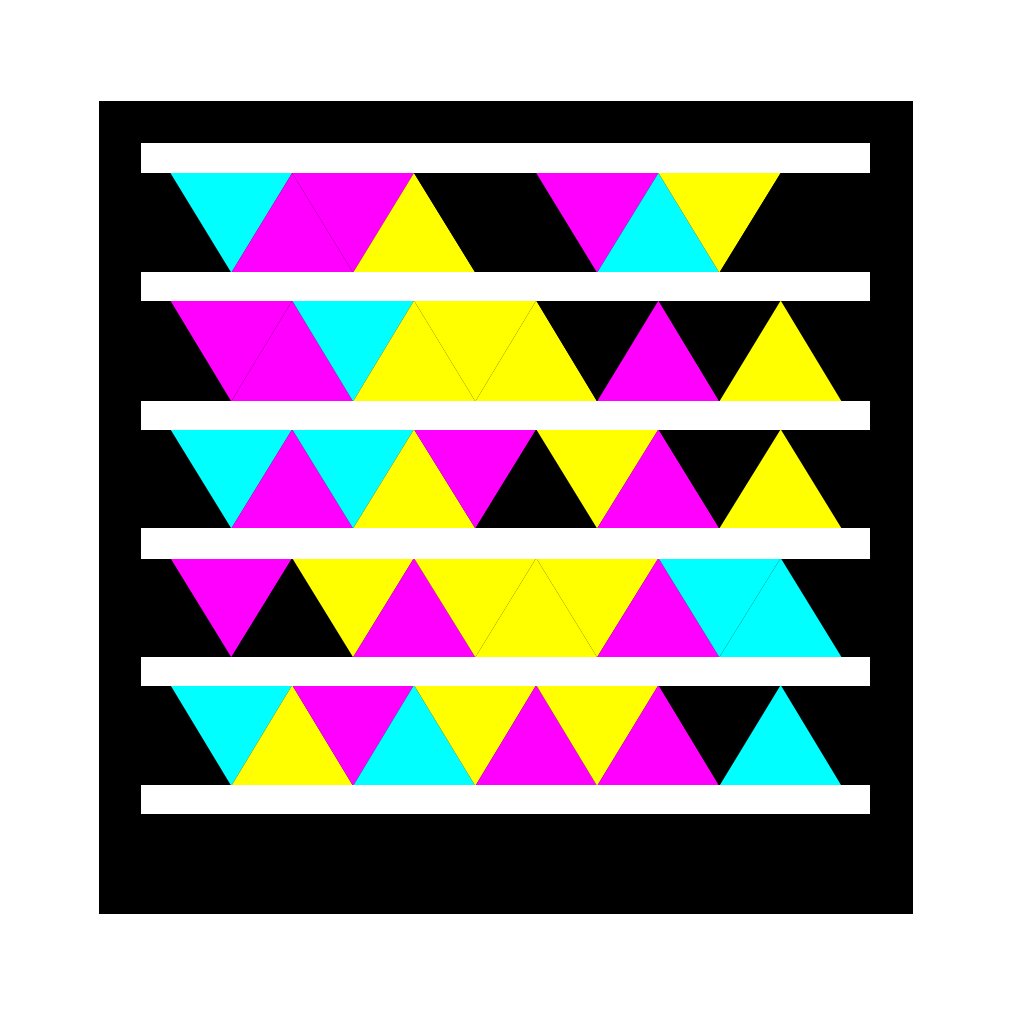
Microsoft Tag

Currently about 70 different types of barcodes and their specific versions exist and are mostly in use in the field of logistics. In terms of mobile tagging, the number of codes is essentially restricted to a dozen types. For reading out 2d-barcodes it is essential to install specific software, a reader, on the mobile device.

The reader uses the camera of a mobile phone for the mobile tagging process. The producers of the reader are very involved in developing solutions to increase the number of compatible mobile phones. Most services on the corresponding websites offer the download directly onto the mobile device or PC. In addition, many providers offer the user a generator for creating their own codes. Some of these generators produce dynamic QR codes, which encode a short redirect URL rather than the final destination, so the code's target can be updated after the code has been printed.

Smartphone cameras can be used in Google's mobile Android operating system via both their own Google Goggles application or 3rd party mobile tag readers. Nokia's Symbian operating system features a scanner which can scan mobile tags, while mbarcode is a reader for the Maemo operating system. In the Apple iOS, a mobile tagging reader is natively included in the iOS 11 update through the camera app, although there are more than fifty paid and free apps are available with both scanning capabilities and hard-linking to URI. With BlackBerry devices, the App World application can natively scan mobile tags. Windows Phone 7.5 is able to scan tags through the Bing search app.

Due to the absence of a standard code, the readers are faced with the same problem. On the one hand there is a remarkable number of readers which aren't able to identify barcodes apart from their own proprietary codes. On the other hand, there are several readers which were created to read out non-proprietary code, these 'open source codes' are the most used for Optical Reading with Mobile like the QR Code and the Data Matrix. However, a QR code is always 60% larger than a DataMatrix code and this tends to mean that DM is the primary code used in packaging and enterprise solutions for example.

== Application areas ==
At present, mobile tagging is finding its way into the day-to-day-life of campaigns in the fields of commercial, public and private tagging. Mobile tagging connects static information carriers with the Internet and encourages the interactive behaviour of the user. The enterprise solutions are where the codes will be monetized and customization for business and commercial use will be at the forefront of intelligent and professional use, examples of which are; e-government, tourism, advertising and targeted marketing, packaging, supply chain management, brand management and brand protection, logistics, track and trace, anti-counterfeit or smuggling, id & passports, transport and ticketing, parking, disability, CRM, cross media campaigns, m-ticketing, m-payments, e-learning, complete integration of localization, personalization, objects and other data.

=== Commercial tagging ===
Commercial tagging includes the use of multi-dimensional barcodes, especially in the fields of mobile marketing and advertising. Showcases in this context are additional information on products (such as the nutrient content on hamburgers), direct downloads (such as free ringtones, clips or mobile games), and the direct link to a specific site of a company. Particularly in the field of commercial tagging it is vital for the code to be able to be branded (it is possible to integrate a logo in the code). It is hard to convince people to use this technology.

=== Public tagging ===
In terms of public tagging, barcodes serve as a hyperlink to additional information on public information carriers. This information may include maps, customer reviews or other non-commercial advice.

=== Private tagging ===
In view of private tagging, personal motives come to the fore. Besides the opportunity for creating direct hyperlinks on blogs or profiles, it is possible to participate immediately in online auctions (such as barcodes on cars with eBay hyperlinks).

Furthermore, barcodes allow services like saving data automatically in the contact list of mobile phones by scanning a code printed on business cards.

In addition to higher user friendliness, private tagging offers novel opportunities for self-presentation.

== See also ==
- CueCat
- Internet of Things
- Object hyperlinking
- QR code
