= North (payment processing company) =

Payments technology company

- Type: Private
- Industry: Financial services; Point of sale; Mobile payment
- Founded: 1992; 34 years ago
- Headquarters: Troy, Michigan, United States
- Key people: Marc Gardner (CEO/President)
- Products: Credit Card Processing, Mobile POS, Virtual Terminal, Merchant Services, Restaurant POS, Retail Point of Sale
- Owner: Marc Gardner
- Number of employees: 1,300 (2024)
- Website: www.north.com

North is a financial technology and payments company founded in 1992 by Marc Gardner, who serves as the company's CEO/President. Formerly known as North American Bancard, the company rebranded as North in 2024.

North is headquartered in Troy, Michigan, with offices and affiliations across the country. The core company employs more than 1,300 people, boasts a network of over 3,000 sales partners, and works with over 350,000 merchants throughout the U.S. In addition, the company works closely with top technology developers and ISVs (independent software vendors) to provide customized solutions for their partners and customers.

North provides technologies in credit, debit, EBT, check conversion and guarantee, ATM, gift and loyalty programs, and online payments. The company processes more than $100 billion per year in electronic transactions across America.

North is also a founding member of Automation Alley, a nonprofit technology business association focused on business growth through innovation and automation.

== History ==
Since 1992, North has grown into the sixth-largest independent, non-bank merchant acquirer in North America.

In 2008, the Michigan Economic Development Corporation (MEDC) recommended that the Michigan Economic Growth Authority (MEGA) approve a $21.5 million state tax credit to North.

The following year, 2009, the company moved its headquarters to a 105,000-square-foot (9,800 m^{2}) building in Troy, MI.

In 2010, the company acquired public-sector-payment company Point & Pay, as well as merchant services technology provider CDI Tech.

In January 2011, North announced the launch of Payanywhere, a mobile payment processing tool. The acquisition of payment services company Velocity occurred in 2013.

In 2014, the company acquired payment processor Electronic Payment Exchange.^{[9]} In June 2015, North announced the launch of the newest version of its Payanywhere Mobile credit card reader, a 3-in-1 credit card reader that was launched in Apple Stores. This version is compatible with iOS devices.

2014 also saw the launch of the Payanywhere Storefront, and the acquisition of Rapid Capital Funding, Electronic Payment Exchange, and Argus Payments (which changed its name to Inovio in 2016).

In 2016, North reached 1,000 employees for the first time. In 2017, the company acquired Total Merchant Services. Hospitality payment service provider SALIDO was acquired in 2019.

Growth and acquisitions continued in the new decade, with the acquisition of HMSKC in 2020; the acquisition of Signature Payments and B2B gateway provider PayTrace occurred the following year. 2021 was also the year that North launched its signature Developer Portal, an online tool for the sourcing and crafting of bespoke software solutions. In 2022, North added CardWorks Acquiring (CWA) to its roster.

== Recognition ==
Founder/CEO/President Marc Gardner received the Ernst & Young's Entrepreneur of the Year award in 2008.

September 2023 brought North honors at Corp! magazine's Salute to Diversity Awards. The ceremony put a spotlight on organizations that champion diversity, equity, and inclusion initiatives and achievements.
