= EPC QR code =

Guidelines on QR codes for credit transfer

- European Payments Council Quick Response Code
- Latest version: 2.10; 17 June 2024
- Organization: European Payments Council
- Website: www.europeanpaymentscouncil.eu/document-library/guidance-documents/standardisation-qr-codes-mscts

The European Payments Council (EPC) Quick Response (QR) code is a technical standard by the European Payments Council. It uses a QR code containing all the necessary information for initiating a SEPA credit transfer (SCT). It is commonly used on invoices and payment requests in the countries that support it (Austria, Belgium, Finland, Germany, The Netherlands, Luxembourg, Estonia, Latvia, Lithuania, Italy).

The EPC guidelines are available from the EPC itself. Another version has also been published by the Federation of Finnish Finance Services (FFI).

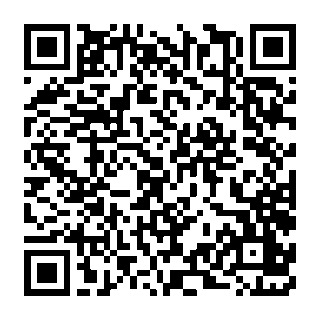
EPC QR code to pay €1 to the Belgian Red Cross

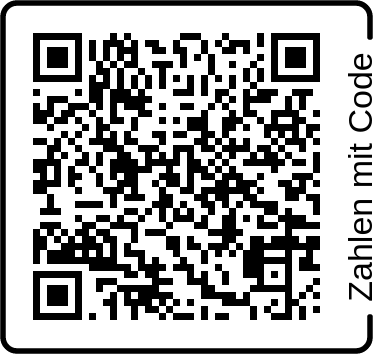
EPC QR code to pay €1 to the Austrian Red Cross

== Sample content of QR Code ==
Service Tag:	BCD
Version:	001
Character set:	1
Identification:	SCT
BIC:	BPOTBEB1
Name:	Red Cross
IBAN:	BE72000000001616
Amount:	EUR1
Reason (4 chars max):	CHAR
Ref of invoice:	Empty line or REFINVOICE
Or text:	Urgency fund or Empty line
Information:	Sample EPC QR code

So the QR string could be

BCD
001
1
SCT
BPOTBEB1
Red Cross
BE72000000001616
EUR1
CHAR

Urgency fund
Sample EPC QR code

== History ==
In 2012, the Austrian payment facilitator STUZZA (now part of PSA Payment Services Austria) defined the content of a QR code that could be used to initiate money transfers within the Single Euro Payments Area.

In February 2013, the European Payments Council (EPC) published the document 'Quick Response Code: Guidelines to Enable Data Capture for the Initiation of a Credit Transfer'.

These guidelines were quickly adopted by the Austrian banks. These QR code can be recognised thanks to the words "Zahlen mit Code" (Pay with Code) on the right.

These guidelines were later on used in Finland in 2015, Germany in 2015 and the Netherlands in 2016.

== See also ==
- Short Payment Descriptor
- International Bank Account Number (IBAN)
