= Thinglink =

ThingLink Oy
- Company type: Private
- Industry: Internet Technology Education Technology
- Founded: 2010
- Headquarters: Palo Alto, California
- Key people: Ulla Koivula, CEO, Alexey Solomatin Head of Product
- Products: Interactive media editor, virtual tour creator.
- Number of employees: 14 (2019)
- Website: www.thinglink.com

Thinglink, also known as Thinglink Oy in Finland and Thinglink Incorporated in the United States of America, is an education and media technology company, based in Palo Alto, California, founded by Ulla-Maaria Koivula (Engeström).

The company, Thinglink, began from the idea of connecting objects in our physical environment to digital information about them, and making the process easy for everyone to perform. Over the years, the company's primary concept expanded to using digital objects, and virtual tours, to access simulations of places and situations in the physical world.

In 2018, Thinglink was awarded the UNESCO ICT in Education.
