= Yellow Arrow =

Public art project (2004–2006)

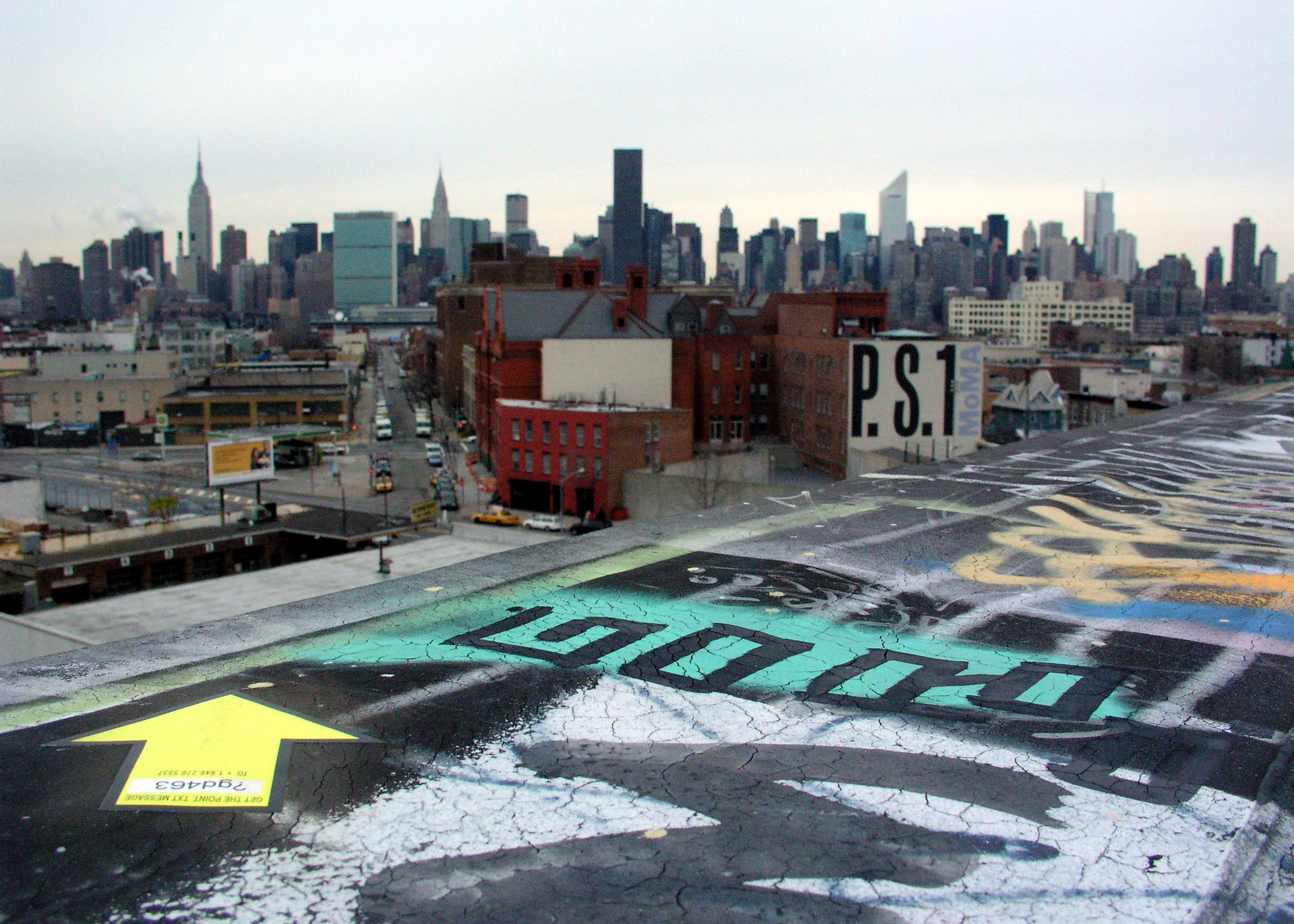
A Yellow Arrow sticker in New York CIty

Yellow Arrow was a public art project created by Christopher Allen, Brian House, and Jesse Shapins that was active from 2004 to 2006. The project is an important example of locative media and mobile phone art and draws concepts from psychogeography.

Yellow Arrow stickers were obtained from the project website and placed anywhere in the public realm. When encountering a sticker on the street, one could send the unique code printed on it as a text message to the project phone number. Moments later a message would be received that was left by the person who placed the sticker.

The Yellow Arrow symbol means "there’s more here: a hidden detail, a funny story, a memory, and a crazy experience." Each arrow linked digital content to a specific location using the mobile phone.

As an underground phenomenon, the project developed an international community, and 7535 Yellow Arrow stickers were placed in 467 cities and 35 countries. Since first appearing at the Psy-Geo-Conflux in New York in May 2004, Yellow Arrow has been featured in The New York Times, Wired, Newsweek, The Washington Post, The Boston Globe, CNN and NBC, the London Times, Politiken, Liberation, Diari de Barcelona, and de Volkskrant. Yellow Arrow was also featured in Lonely Planet's Guide to Experimental Travel.

In Toward the Sentient City, Mark Shepard writes, "In place of the ubiquitous bronze plaque providing "official narratives" affixed to the side of "significant" urban structures or spaces, Yellow Arrow provides for the unofficial annotation of everyday urban places by ordinary citizens."

Yellow Arrow was included in the exhibition Design and the Elastic Mind at the Museum of Modern Art in New York City in 2008.

In 2006, the project was discontinued and its content was archived on Flickr.
