= CueCat =

Cat-shaped handheld barcode reader

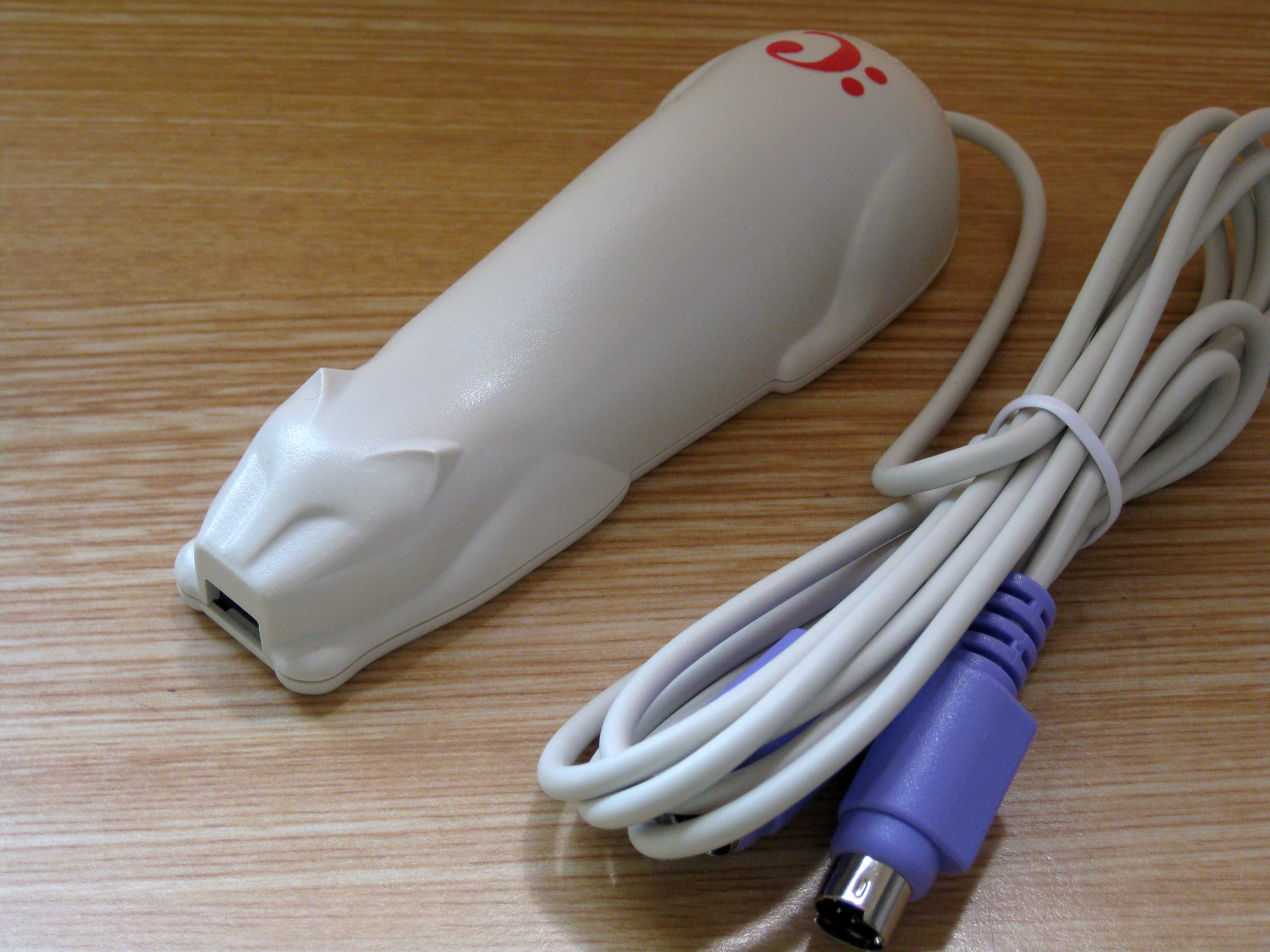
CueCat barcode scanner and interposer cables with male and female PS/2 connectors

The CueCat, styled :CueCat with a leading colon, is a cat-shaped handheld barcode reader designed to allow a user to open a link to an Internet URL by scanning a barcode. The devices were given away free to Internet users starting in 2000 by the now-defunct Digital Convergence Corporation.

By year-end 2001, barcodes were no longer distributed for the device, and scanning with the device using its original software no longer yielded results. The CueCat can read several common barcode types, in addition to the proprietary CUE barcodes which had been promoted by Digital Convergence.

== Description ==
The CueCat was named CUE for the unique bar code which the device scanned and CAT as a wordplay on "Keystroke Automation Technology". It enabled a user to open a link to an Internet URL by scanning a barcode — called a "cue" by Digital Convergence — appearing in an article or catalog or on some other printed matter. In this way, a user could be directed to a web page containing related information without having to type in a URL. The company asserted that the ability of the device to direct users to a specific URL, rather than a domain name, was valuable. In addition, television broadcasters could use an audio tone in programs or commercials that acted as a web address shortcut if a TV was connected to a computer via an audio cable.

The CueCat was connected to computers in the same way as a keystroke logger, as a "keyboard wedge", interposer, or pass-through between the keyboard PS/2 jack and the motherboard PS/2 port. Because of USB-PS/2 compatibility, USB-PS/2 adapters may be optionally used. A native USB version of the CueCat scanner hardware was also produced, but fewer of them were made before all manufacturing of the hardware was discontinued.

== Marketing ==
A CueCat "cue". The bars are tilted 22.5° to the left, both for aesthetic reasons and to avoid Lemelson parallel barcode patent concerns.

The CueCat patents are held by Jeffry Jovan Philyaw, who changed his name to Jovan Hutton Pulitzer after the failure of CueCat. Belo Corporation, parent company of the Dallas Morning News and owner of many TV stations, invested US$37.5 million in Digital Convergence, RadioShack $30 million, Young & Rubicam $28 million, and Coca-Cola $10 million. Other investors included General Electric, and E. W. Scripps Company. The total amount invested was $185 million.

Each CueCat cost RadioShack about $6.50 to manufacture.

Starting in late 2000 and continuing for about a year, advertisements, special web editions, and editorial content containing CueCat barcodes appeared in many US periodicals, including Parade, Forbes, and Wired. The Dallas Morning News and other Belo-owned newspapers printed the barcodes next to major articles and regular features like stocks and weather. Commercial publications such as Adweek, Brandweek, and Mediaweek employed the technology. The CueCat bar codes also appeared in select Verizon Yellow Pages, providing advertisers with a link to additional information.

For a time, RadioShack printed these barcodes in its product catalogs, and distributed CueCat devices through its retail chain to customers at no charge. Forbes magazine mailed out the first 830,000 CueCats as gifts to their subscribers, since the magazine was starting to print CRQ ("See Our Cue") barcodes in their magazine. Wired magazine mailed over 500,000 of the free devices as gifts to their subscribers. Each publisher private-branded the CueCat hardware they sent to their mailing list.

== Marketing partners ==
Organizations that used the :CueCat and compatible :CRQ software:

=== Magazines ===
- Adweek
- Brandweek
- Mediaweek
- MC Magazine
- Forbes
- Wired
- Parade

=== Catalogs ===
- RadioShack

=== Newspapers ===
- The Dallas Morning News
- Milwaukee Journal Sentinel
- The Providence Journal
- The Press-Enterprise

=== Broadcast stations ===
- WNBC-TV, New York
- KNBC-TV, Los Angeles
- WMAQ-TV, Chicago
- WCAU-TV, Philadelphia
- WFAA, Dallas
- WRC-TV, Washington DC
- WXYZ-TV, Detroit
- KHOU, Houston
- KING-TV/KONG-TV, Seattle
- WFTS, Tampa
- WEWS, Cleveland
- WTVJ, Miami
- KTVK/KASW, Phoenix
- KMOV, St. Louis
- KGW, Portland
- WMAR, Baltimore
- KNSD, San Diego
- WVIT, Hartford
- WCNC, Charlotte
- WNCN, Raleigh
- KSHB, Kansas City
- WCPO, Cincinnati
- WTMJ-TV, Milwaukee
- WCMH, Columbus
- KENS, San Antonio
- WVTM, Birmingham
- WWL, New Orleans
- WVEC, Norfolk
- WPTV, West Palm Beach
- WHAS, Louisville
- WJAR, Providence
- KTNV, Las Vegas
- KMPH, Fresno
- KOTV, Tulsa
- KVUE, Austin
- KMSB/KTTU Tucson
- KPTM, Omaha
- KREM/KSKN Spokane
- KTVB, Boise

== User experience ==
Installation of software and hardware, configuration, and registration took around an hour. Registration required the user's name, age, and e-mail address, and demanded completion of a lengthy survey with invasive questions about shopping habits, hobbies, and educational level. Then users could scan bar codes on groceries, bar codes on books, and custom bar codes in ads in magazines, newspapers, Verizon Yellow Pages, and RadioShack catalogs. The :CRQ software then used that unique serial number from the device to return a URL which directed the user's browser to the sponsored website. It also created a permanent advertisement-displaying taskbar on the user's computers, and could log the web-surfing habits associated with a user's real name and email address.

== Reception ==
In The Wall Street Journal, Walter Mossberg criticized CueCat: "In order to scan in codes from magazines and newspapers, you have to be reading them in front of your PC. That's unnatural and ridiculous." Mossberg wrote that the device "fails miserably. Using it is just unnatural." He concluded that the CueCat "isn't worth installing and using, even though it's available free of charge". Joel Spolsky, a computer technology reviewer, also criticized the device as "not solving a problem" and characterized the venture as a "feeble business idea".

The CueCat is now widely described as a commercial failure. It was ranked twentieth in "The 25 Worst Tech Products of All Time" by PC World magazine in 2006. The CueCat's critics said the device was ultimately of little use. Joe Salkowski of the Chicago Tribune wrote, "You have to wonder about a business plan based on the notion that people want to interact with a soda can", while Debbie Barham of the Evening Standard quipped that the CueCat "fails to solve a problem which never existed". In December 2009, the popular gadget blog Gizmodo voted the CueCat the #1 worst invention of the decade of the "2000s". In 2010, Time magazine included it on a list of "The 50 worst Inventions", adding that people didn't accept "the idea of reading their magazines next to a wired cat-shaped scanner".

The CueCat device was controversial, initially because of privacy concerns about its collection of aggregate user data. Each CueCat has a unique serial number, and users suspected that Digital Convergence could compile a database of all barcodes scanned by a given user and connect it to the user's name and address. For this reason, and because the demographic market targeted by Digital Convergence was unusually tech-savvy, numerous websites arose detailing instructions for "declawing" the CueCat — blocking or encrypting the data it sent to Digital Convergence. Digital Convergence registered the domain "digitaldemographics.com", giving additional credence to privacy concerns about the use of data.

== Security breach ==
According to Internet technologist and Interhack founder Matt Curtin, each scan delivered the product code, the user's ID and the scanner's ID back to Digital Convergence.

The data format was proprietary, and was scrambled so the barcode data could not be read as plain text. However, the barcode itself is closely related to Code 128, and the scanner was also capable of reading EAN/UPC and other symbologies, such as Priority Mail, UPC-A, UPC-E, EAN-13, EAN-8, 2-of-5 interleaved, CODABAR, CODE39, CODE128, and ISBN. Because of the weak obfuscation of the data, meant only to protect the company under DMCA guidelines (like DVD-Video's Content Scramble System), software for decoding the CueCat's output quickly appeared on the Internet, followed by a plethora of unofficial applications.

":CRQ" ("see our cue"), the desktop software, intercepted the data from both the keyboard and the CueCat, before passing it on to the operating system. Versions for both Windows 32-bit or Mac OS 9 were included. Users of this software were required to register with their ZIP code, gender, and email address. This registration process enabled the device to deliver relevant content to a single or multiple users in a household.

Privacy groups warned that it could be used to track readers' online behavior because each unit has a unique identifier. Belo officials said they would not track individual CueCat users but would gather anonymous information grouped by age, gender and ZIP code.

In September 2000, security watchdog website Securitywatch.com notified Digital Convergence of a security vulnerability on the Digital Convergence website that exposed private information about CueCat users. Digital Convergence immediately shut down that part of their website, and their investigation concluded that approximately 140,000 CueCat users who had registered their CueCat were exposed to a breach that revealed their name, email address, age range, gender and zip code. This was not a breach of the main user database itself, but a flat text file used only for reporting purposes that was generated by ColdFusion code that was saved on a publicly available portion of the Digital Convergence web server.

This failure was given a multi-citation Octopus TV "Failure Award" regarding brands that failed to take off and were hacked.

== Aftermath ==
Digital Convergence responded to this security breach by sending an email to those affected by the incident claiming that it was correcting this problem and would be offering them a $10 gift certificate to RadioShack, an investor in Digital Convergence.

The company's initial response to these hacks was to assert that users did not own the devices and had no right to modify or reverse engineer them. Threats of legal action against the hackers swiftly brought on more controversy and criticism. The company changed the licensing agreement several times, adding explicit restrictions, apparently in response to hacker activity. Hackers argued that the changes did not apply retroactively to devices that had been purchased under older versions of the license, and that the thousands of users who received unsolicited CueCats in the mail had neither agreed to nor were legally bound by the license.

No lawsuit was ever brought against "hackers", as this tactic was not employed to go after specific users or the hacker community, but to show "reasonable assertion". This would prevent another corporation from developing integrated software within an operating system or browser, which could take over the device and circumvent the :CRQ supervisory software and the revenue model that Digital Convergence desired.

In May 2001, Digital Convergence fired most of its 225-person workforce.

In September 2001, Belo Corporation, CueCat investor and owner of newspapers and TV stations, who had sent at least 200,000 free CueCats to its readers, wrote off their $37.5 million investment, and stopped using CueCat technology with newspapers's editions, notably The Press-Enterprise, The Dallas Morning News, and The Providence Journal.

Investors in CueCat lost their $185 million. Technology journalist Scott Rosenberg called the CueCat a "Rube Goldberg contraption", a "massive flop", and a "fiasco".

== Awards ==
In 2001, Computerworld named CueCat as a Laureate in the Media Arts & Entertainment category.

In 2001, Software and Information Industry Association named Digital Convergence Corp.'s :CRQ Technology as Best Reference Tool.

== Surplus liquidation ==
In June 2005, a liquidator offered two million CueCats for sale at $0.30 each (in quantities of 500,000 or more).

Once available for free, the device can now be found on sale at eBay for prices ranging from $5 to as much as $100.

== Open source ==
Hobbyists have reverse-engineered the firmware, software, and the customer database. Other unrelated companies sold and supported surplus new CueCats as low-cost barcode scanners for use with their software, such as the Readerware library cataloging utility. Eventually, the widespread availability of barcode scanner smartphone apps made the CueCat's capabilities mostly superfluous.

== Books ==
- Grand, Joe; Mitnick, Kevin D.; Russell, Ryan (2004-01-29). "Declawing Your CueCat". Hardware Hacking: Have Fun while Voiding your Warranty. Elsevier. pp. 48–82. ISBN 9781932266832. OCLC 741395468.

== Gallery ==
:CueCat

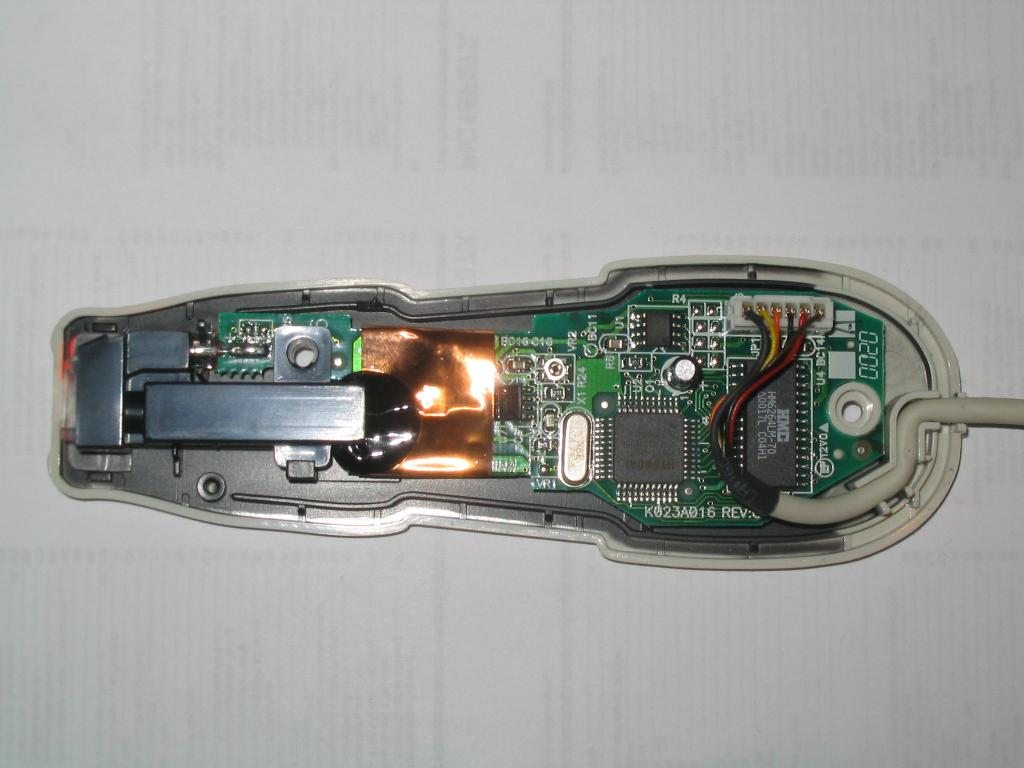

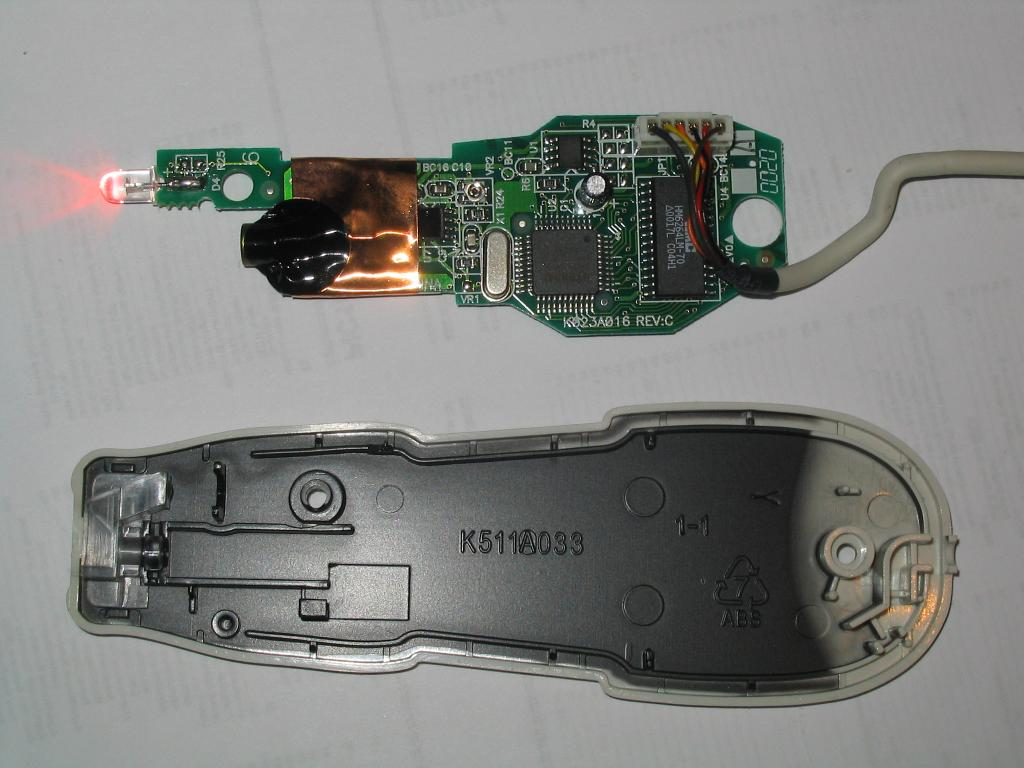

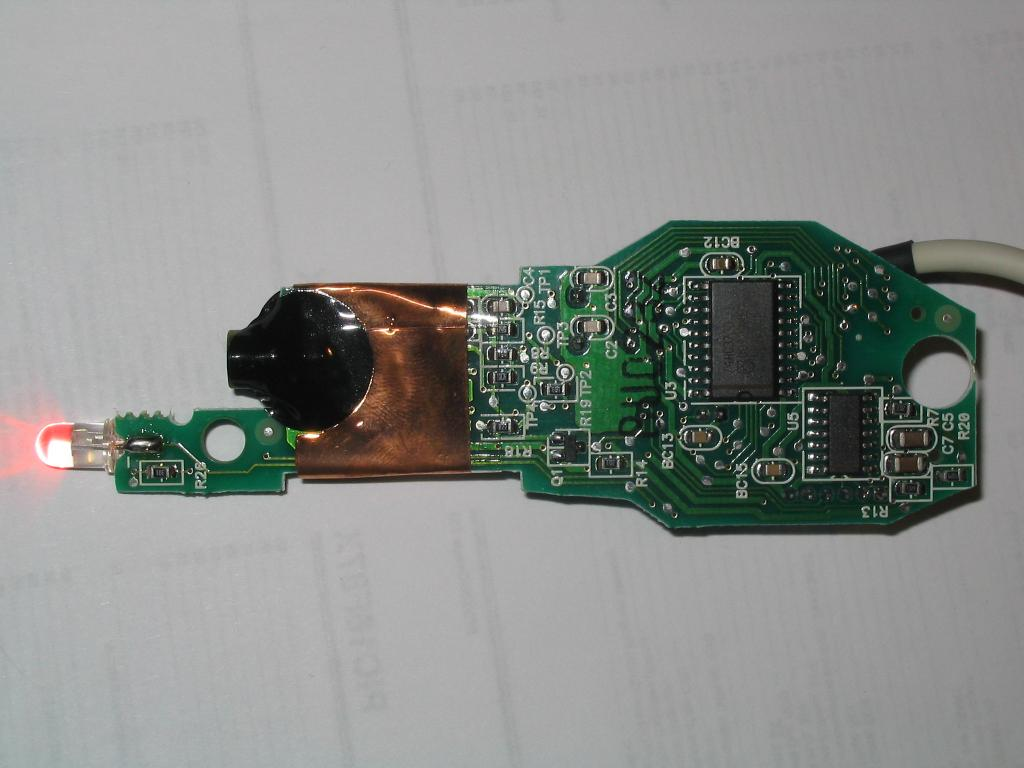

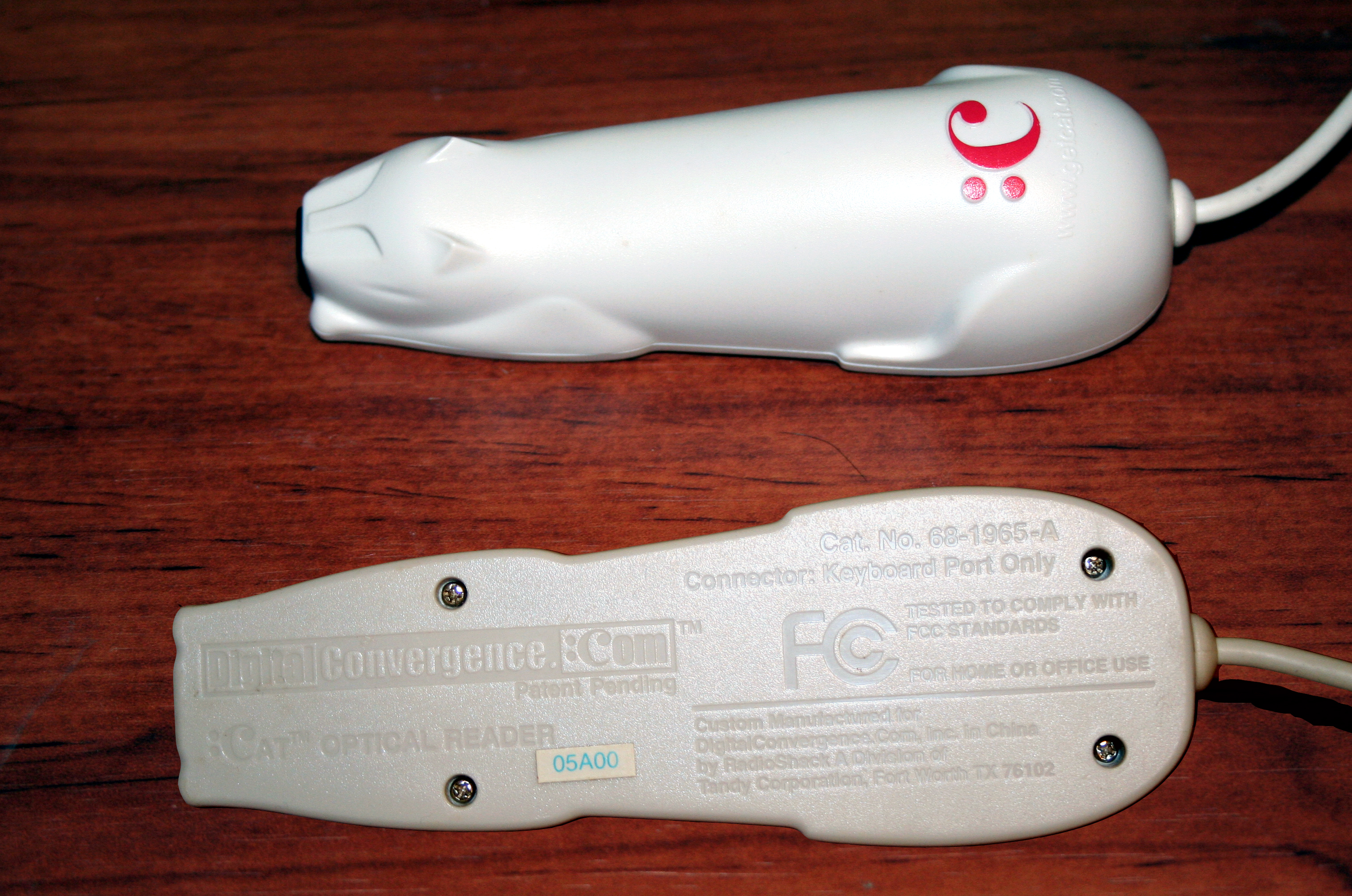

== See also ==
- Mobile tagging
- QR code
- i-Opener
