= QR code =

Type of two-dimensional barcode

A QR code for the URL of the English Wikipedia main page

A QR code, short for quick-response code, is a type of two-dimensional matrix barcode invented in 1994 by Masahiro Hara of the Japanese company Denso Wave for labelling automobile parts. It features white ("0") and black ("1") squares within a square grid featuring fiducial markers on the corners, readable by imaging devices like cameras, and processed using Reed–Solomon error correction until the image can be appropriately interpreted. The required data is then extracted from patterns that are present in both the horizontal and the vertical components of the QR image.

Whereas a barcode is a machine-readable optical image that contains information specific to the labeled item, the QR code contains the data for a locator, an identifier, and web tracking. To store data efficiently, QR codes use four standardized modes of encoding: numeric, alphanumeric, byte or binary, and kanji. Compared to standard UPC barcodes, the QR labeling system was applied beyond the automobile industry because of faster reading of the optical image and greater data-storage capacity in applications such as product tracking, item identification, time tracking, document management, and general marketing.

As of 2026, QR codes are used in a broad context, including both commercial tracking applications and convenience-oriented applications aimed at mobile phone users (termed mobile tagging). QR codes may be used to display text to the user, to open a webpage on the user's device, to add a vCard contact to the user's device, to open a Uniform Resource Identifier (URI), to connect to a wireless network, to compose an email or text message, or as a method of payment.

== History ==
Demo of printing a QR code

The QR code system was invented in 1994, at the Denso Wave automotive products company in Japan. The initial alternating-square design presented by the team of researchers, headed by Masahiro Hara, was influenced by the black and white stones played on a Go board; the pattern of the position detection markers was determined by finding the least-used sequence of alternating black-white areas on printed matter, which was found to be (1:1:3:1:1). The functional purpose of the QR code system was to facilitate keeping track of the types and numbers of automobile parts, by replacing individually-scanned bar-code labels on each box of auto parts with a single label that contained the data of each label. The quadrangular configuration of the QR code system consolidated the data of the various bar-code labels with kanji, kana, and alphanumeric codes printed onto a single label.

=== COVID-19 pandemic ===
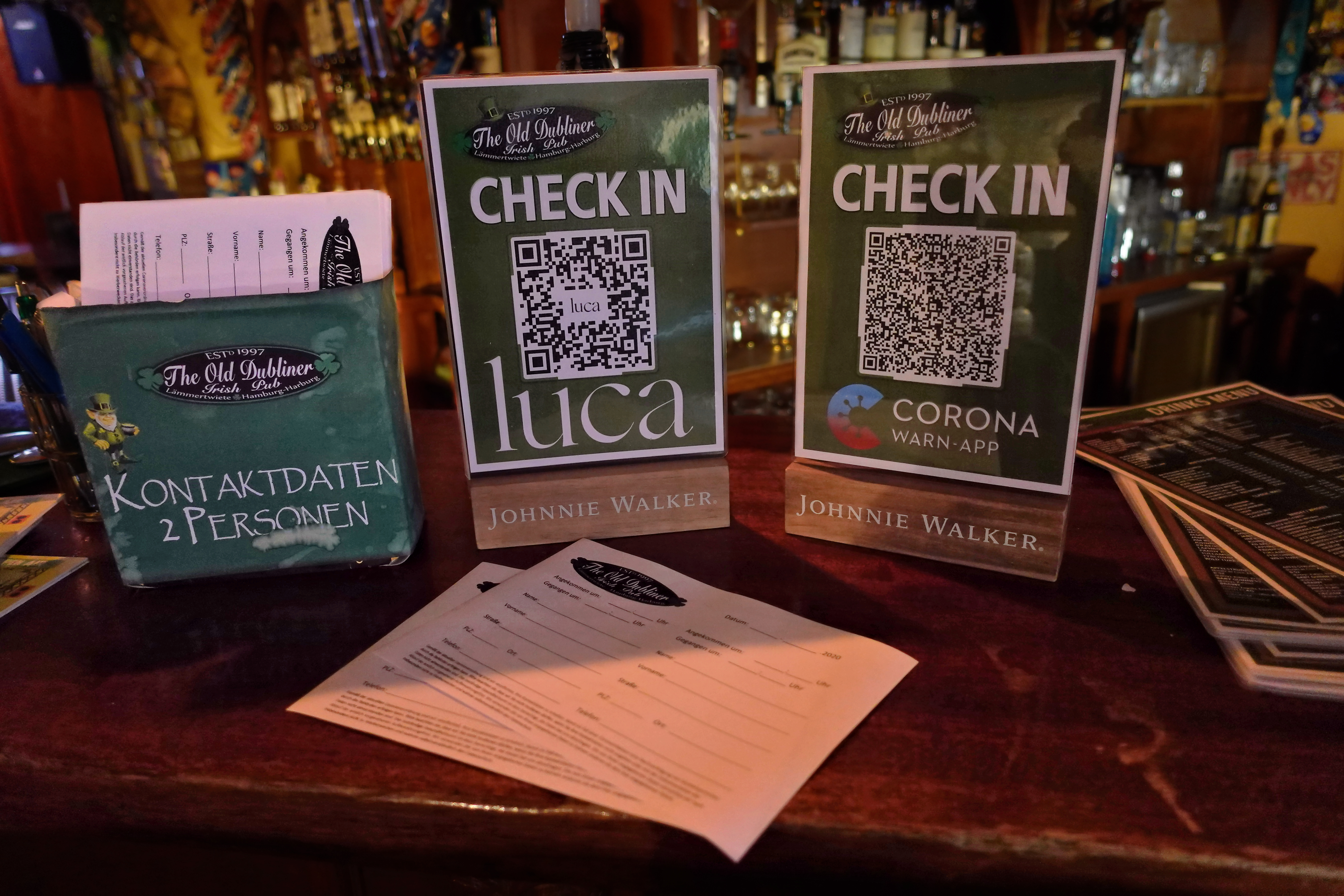
Two QR codes that link to German contact tracing app check-ins during the COVID-19 pandemic

After the COVID-19 pandemic began spreading, QR codes began to be used as a "touchless" system to display information, show menus, or provide updated consumer information, especially in the hospitality industry. Restaurants replaced paper or laminated plastic menus with QR code decals on the table, which opened an online version of the menu. This prevented the need to dispose of single-use paper menus, or institute cleaning and sanitizing procedures for permanent menus after each use. Local television stations utilized codes on local newscasts to allow viewers quicker access to stories or information involving the pandemic, including testing and immunization scheduling websites, or for links within stories mentioned in the newscasts overall. This shift also prompted discussion about digital access, as reliance on QR codes assumes the availability of smartphones, internet connectivity, and digital literacy, which may exclude some users.

In Australia, patrons were required to scan QR codes at shops, clubs, supermarkets, and other service and retail establishments on entry to assist contact tracing. Singapore, Taiwan, the United Kingdom, and New Zealand used similar systems.

QR codes were also present on COVID-19 vaccination certificates in places such as Canada and the EU (EU Digital COVID certificate), where they could be scanned to verify the information on the certificate.

== Adoption ==
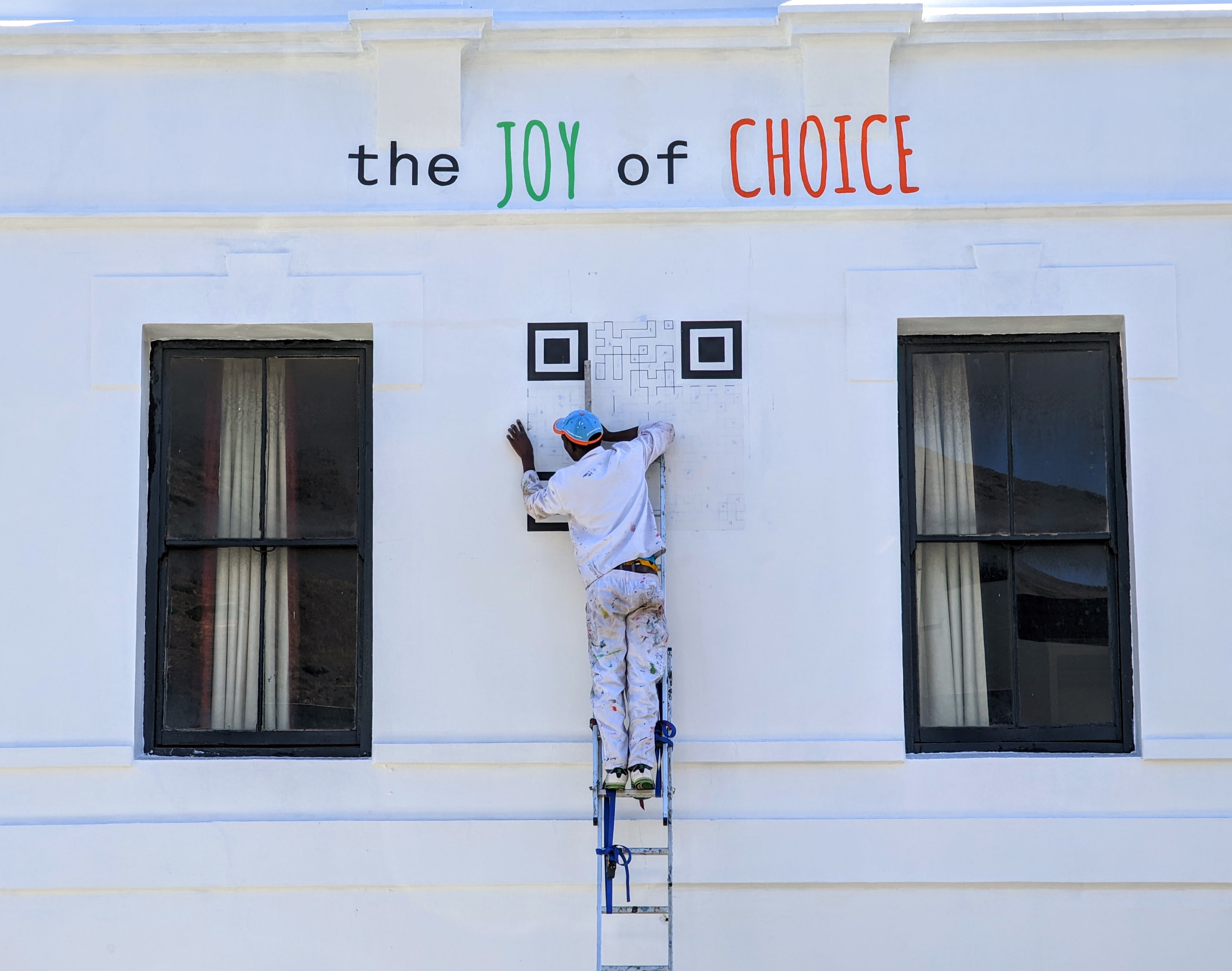
QR codes can be displayed on buildings, such as this one being painted in Cape Town.

During June 2011, 14 million American mobile users scanned a QR code or a barcode. Some 58% of those users scanned a QR or barcode from their homes, while 39% scanned from retail stores; 53% of the 14 million users were men between the ages of 18 and 34.

In developing countries including China, India QR code payment is a very popular and convenient method of making payments. Since Alipay designed a QR code payment method in 2011, mobile payment has been quickly adopted in China. As of 2018, around 83% of all payments were made via mobile payment.

In September 2020, a survey found that 18.8 percent of consumers in the United States and the United Kingdom strongly agreed that they had noticed an increase in QR code use since the then-active COVID-19-related restrictions had begun several months prior.

In 2022, 89 million people in the United States scanned a QR code using their mobile devices, up by 26 percent compared to 2020. The majority of QR code users used them to make payments or to access product and menu information.

There are many QR code generators available as software or as online tools that are either free or require a paid subscription. The QR code has become one of the most-used types of two-dimensional code. Microsoft Office and LibreOffice have a functionality to insert QR code into documents. Google had an API, now deprecated, to generate QR codes, and apps for scanning QR codes can be found on nearly all smartphone devices.

Different studies have been conducted to assess the effectiveness of QR codes as a means of conveying labelling information and their use as part of a food traceability system. In a field experiment, it was found that when provided free access to a smartphone with a QR code scanning app, 52.6% of participants would use it to access labelling information. A study made in South Korea showed that consumers appreciate QR codes used in the food traceability system, as they provide detailed information about food, as well as information that helps them in their purchasing decision.

== Uses ==
Although initially used to track parts in vehicle manufacturing, QR codes are used over a much wider range of applications. These include commercial tracking, warehouse stock control, entertainment and transport ticketing, product and loyalty marketing, and in-store product labeling. Examples of marketing include where a company's discounted and percent discount can be captured using a QR code decoder that is a mobile app, or storing a company's information such as address and related information alongside its alpha-numeric text data as can be seen in telephone directory yellow pages.

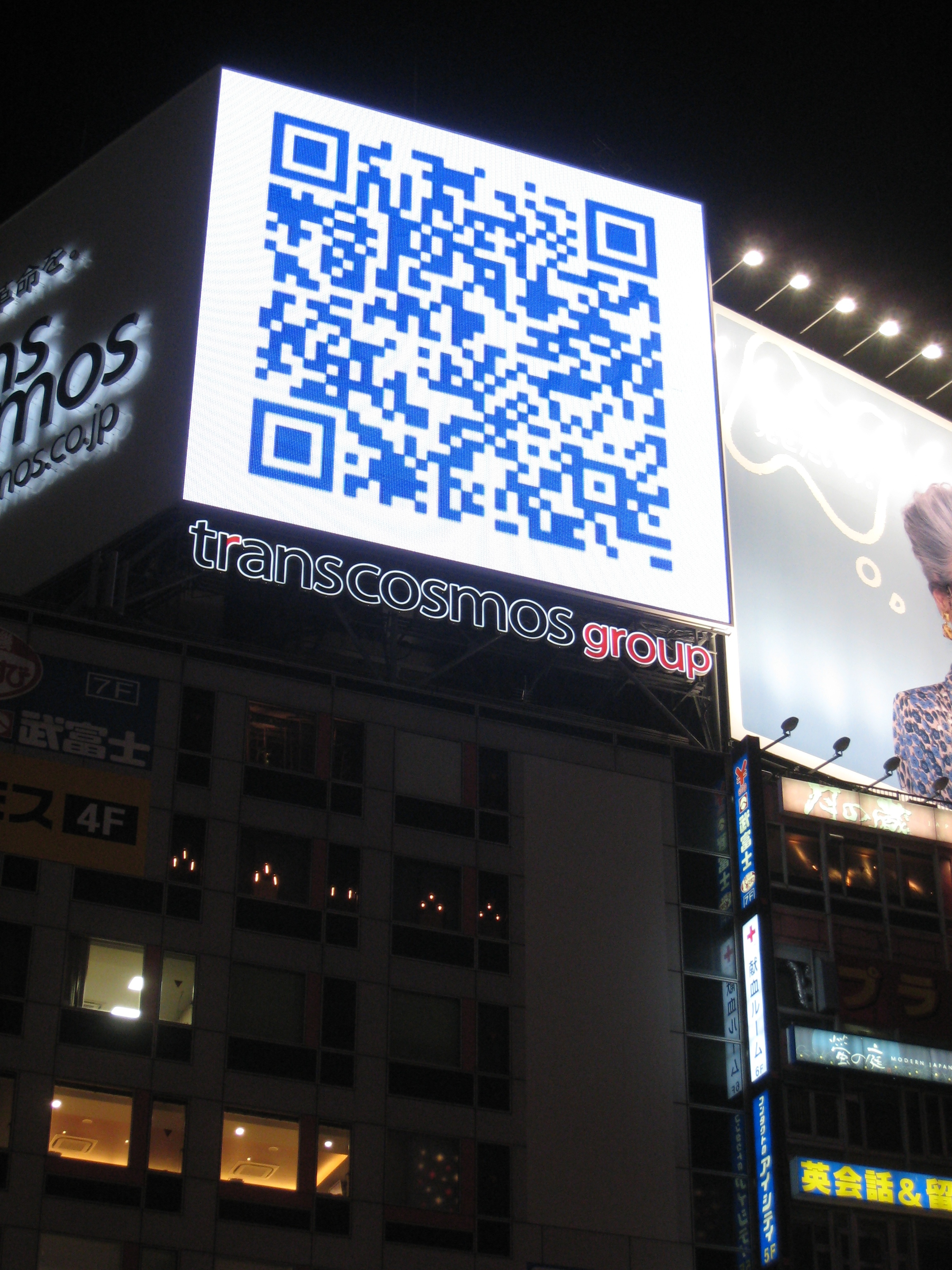
QR codes may appear in very public places such as this large billboard in Japan; this one links to the sagasou.mobi website.

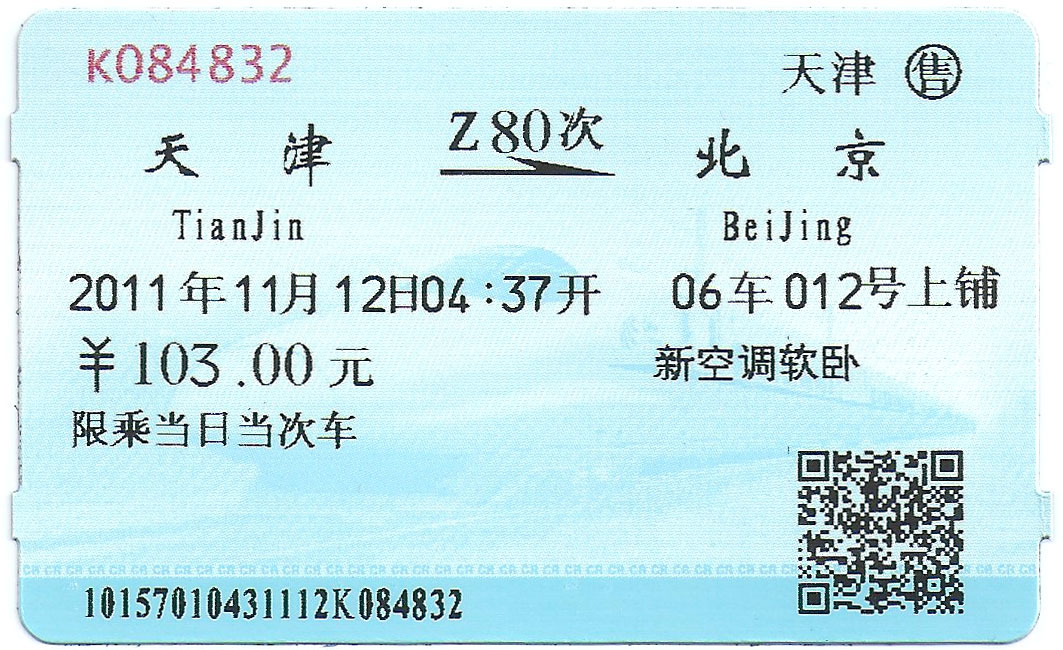
QR codes have been used and printed on train tickets in China since 2010.

=== Currency design ===
QR codes have been incorporated into currency. In June 2011, the Royal Dutch Mint (Koninklijke Nederlandse Munt) issued the world's first official coin with a QR code to celebrate the centenary of its current building and premises. The coin can be scanned by a smartphone and originally linked to a special website with content about the historical event and design of the coin. In 2014, the Central Bank of Nigeria issued a 100-naira banknote to commemorate its centennial, the first banknote to incorporate a QR code in its design. When scanned with an internet-enabled mobile device, the code directs the user to a website that tells the centenary story of Nigeria.

In 2015, the Central Bank of the Russian Federation issued a 100-rubles note to commemorate the annexation of Crimea by the Russian Federation. It contains a QR code into its design, and when scanned with an internet-enabled mobile device, the code goes to a website that details the historical and technical background of the commemorative note. In 2017, the Bank of Ghana issued a 5-cedis banknote to commemorate 60 years of central banking in Ghana. It contains a QR code in its design which, when scanned with an internet-enabled mobile device, goes to the official Bank of Ghana website.

=== Advertising ===
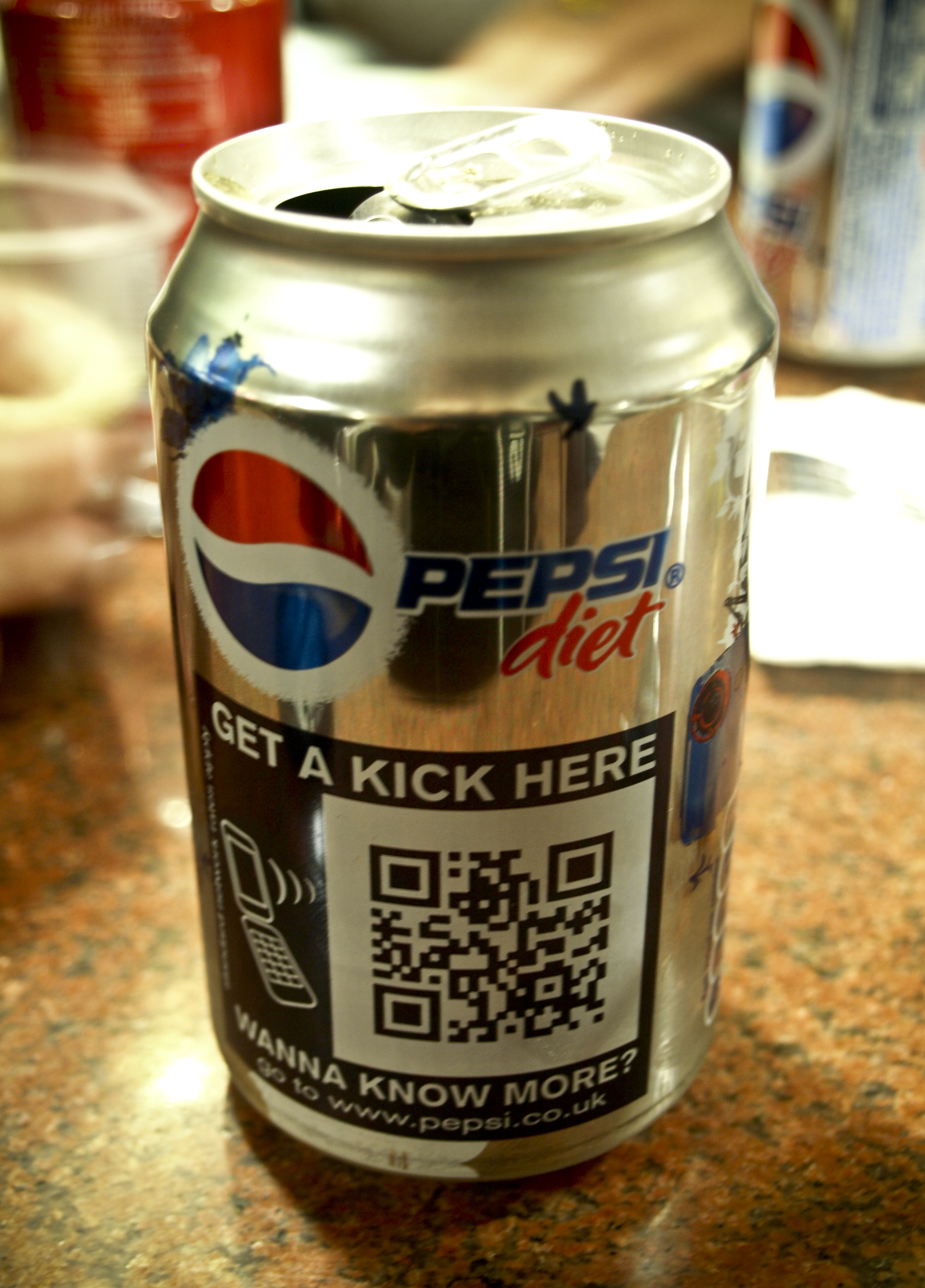
A QR code printed on the packaging of a cola can, linking directly to the Pepsi website, so the user is not required to manually enter the web address

QR codes have become common in consumer advertising. Typically, a smartphone is used as a QR code scanner, displaying the code and converting it to some useful form (such as a standard URL for a website, thereby obviating the need for a user to type it into a web browser).

QR codes have become a focus of advertising strategy to provide a way to access a brand's website more quickly than by manually entering a URL. Beyond mere convenience to the consumer, the importance of this capability is the belief that it increases the conversion rate: the chance that contact with the advertisement will convert to a sale. It coaxes interested prospects further down the conversion funnel with little delay or effort, bringing the viewer to the advertiser's website immediately, whereas a longer and more targeted sales pitch may lose the viewer's interest.

=== Government services ===
They can also be used to store personal information for organizations. An example of this is the Philippines National Bureau of Investigation (NBI) where NBI clearances now come with a QR code. Many of these applications target mobile-phone users (via mobile tagging). Users may receive text, add a vCard contact to their device, open a URL, or compose an e-mail or text message after scanning QR codes. They can generate and print their own QR codes for others to scan and use by visiting one of several pay or free QR code-generating sites or apps.

=== Virtual stores ===
QR codes have been used to establish "virtual stores", where a gallery of product information and QR codes is presented to the customer, e.g. on a train station wall. The customers scan the QR codes, and the products are delivered to their homes. This use started in South Korea, and Argentina, but is currently expanding globally. Walmart, Procter & Gamble and Woolworths have already adopted the Virtual Store concept.

=== QR code payment ===
QR codes can be used to store bank account information or credit card information, or they can be specifically designed to work with particular payment provider applications. There are several trial applications of QR code payments across the world.

In November 2012, QR code payments were deployed on a larger scale in the Czech Republic when an open format for payment information exchange – a Short Payment Descriptor – was introduced and endorsed by the Czech Banking Association as the official local solution for QR payments. In 2013, the European Payment Council provided guidelines for the EPC QR code enabling SCT initiation within the Eurozone.

In September 2016, the Reserve Bank of India (RBI) launched the eponymously named BharatQR, a common QR code jointly developed by all the four major card payment companies – National Payments Corporation of India that runs RuPay cards along with Mastercard, Visa, and American Express. It will also have the capability of accepting payments on the Unified Payments Interface (UPI) platform.

In 2017, Singapore created a task force including government agencies such as the Monetary Authority of Singapore and Infocomm Media Development Authority to spearhead a system for e-payments using standardized QR code specifications. These specific dimensions are specialized for Singapore. The e-payment system, Singapore Quick Response Code (SGQR), essentially merges various QR codes into one label that can be used by both parties in the payment system. This allows for various banking apps to facilitate payments between multiple customers and a merchant that displays a single QR code. The SGQR scheme is co-owned by MAS and IMDA. A single SGQR label contains e-payments and combines multiple payment options. People making purchases can scan the code and see which payment options the merchant accepts.

=== Website login ===
QR codes can be used to log into websites: a QR code is shown on the login page on a computer screen, and when a registered user scans it with a verified smartphone, they will automatically be logged in. Authentication is performed by the smartphone, which contacts the server. Google deployed such a login scheme in 2012.

=== Mobile ticket ===
There is a system whereby a QR code can be displayed on a device such as a smartphone and used as an admission ticket. Its use is common for J1 League and Nippon Professional Baseball tickets in Japan. In some cases, rights can be transferred via the Internet. In Latvia, QR codes can be scanned in Riga public transport to validate Rīgas Satiksme e-tickets.

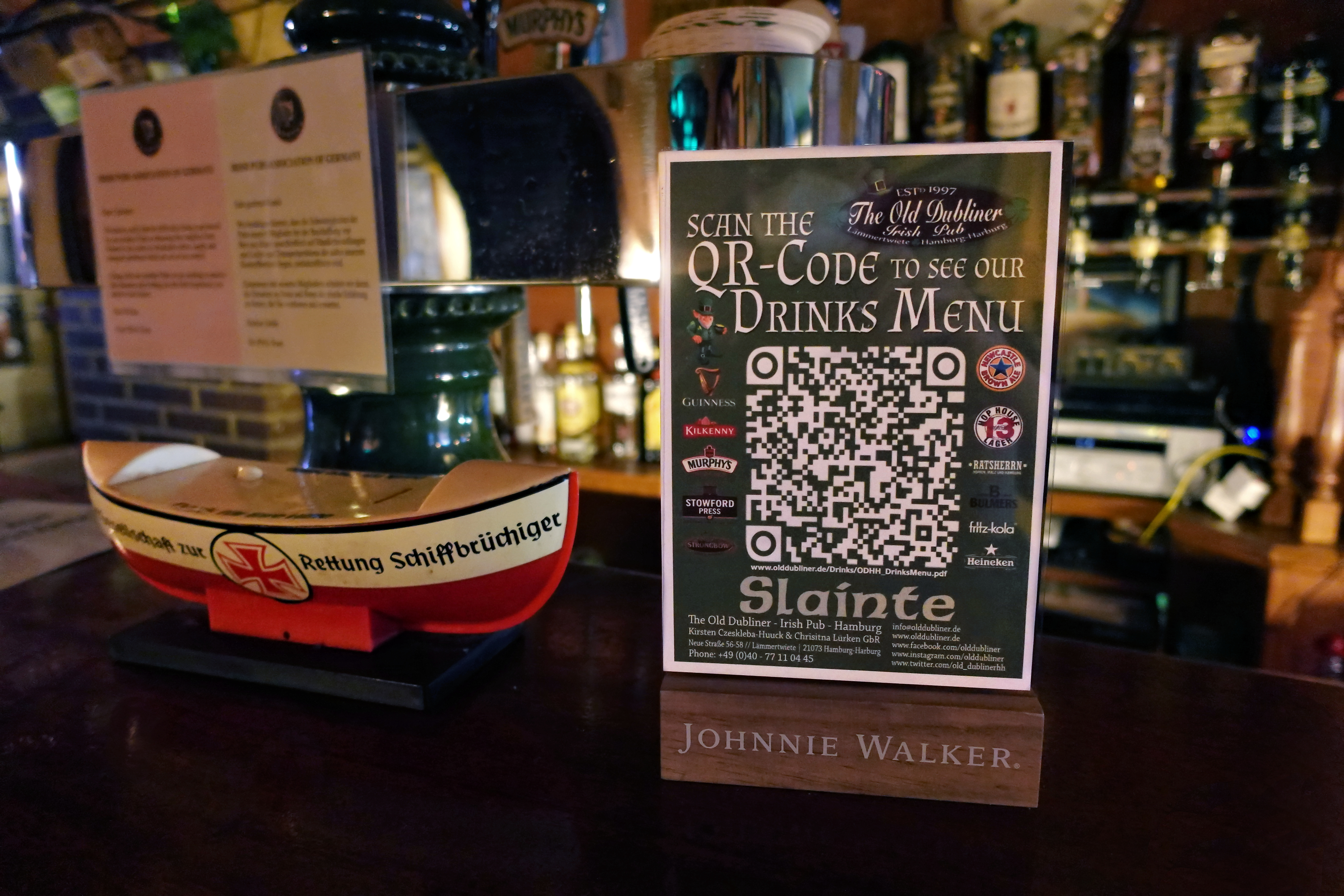
A sign with a QR code that links to a drinks menu

=== Restaurant ordering ===
Restaurants can present a QR code near the front door or at the table allowing guests to view an online menu, or even redirect them to an online ordering website or app, allowing them to order or possibly pay for their meal without having to use a cashier or waiter. QR codes can also link to daily or weekly specials that are not printed on the standardized menus, and enable the establishment to update the entire menu without needing to print copies. At table-serve restaurants, QR codes enable guests to order and pay for their meals without a waiter involved – the QR code contains the table number so servers know where to bring the food. This application has grown especially since the need for social distancing during the 2020 COVID-19 pandemic prompted reduced contact between service staff and customers.

=== Joining a Wi‑Fi network ===
A QR code to automatically join a Wi‑Fi network

By specifying the SSID, encryption type, password/passphrase, and whether the SSID is hidden or not, mobile device users can quickly scan and join networks without having to manually enter the data. A MeCard-like format is supported by Android and iOS 11+.

- Common format: WIFI:S:<SSID>;T:<WEP|WPA|nopass>;P:<PASSWORD>;H:<true|false|blank>;;
- Sample: WIFI:S:MySSID;T:WPA;P:MyPassW0rd;;

=== Funerary use ===
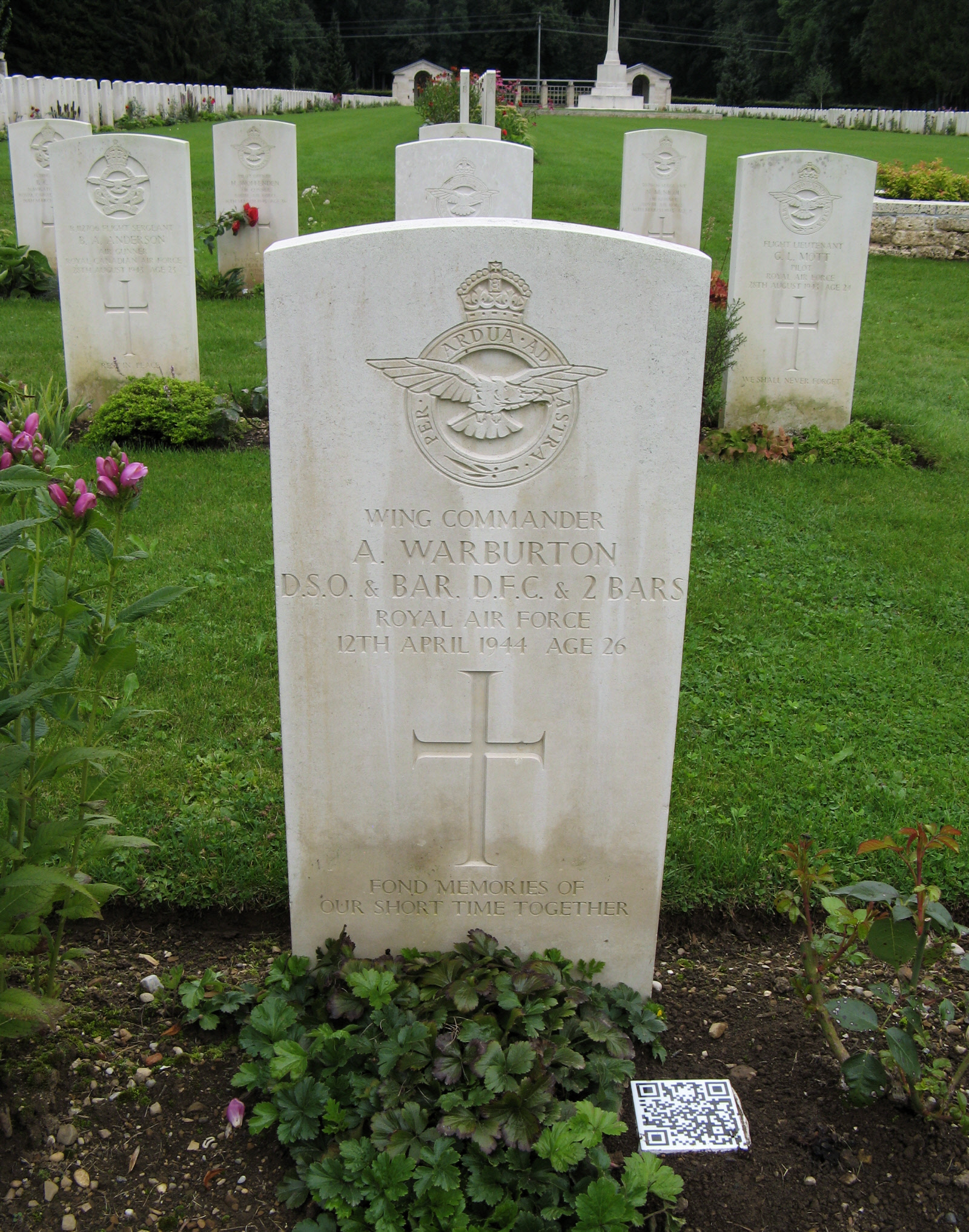
QR code tile next to the grave of Wing Commander Adrian Warburton at Durnbach War Cemetery in Gmund am Tegernsee, Germany. The code links to his Wikipedia entry.

A QR code can link to an obituary and can be placed on a headstone. In 2008, Ishinokoe in Yamanashi Prefecture, Japan began to sell tombstones with QR codes produced by IT DeSign, where the code leads to a virtual grave site of the deceased. Other companies, such as Wisconsin-based Interactive Headstones, have also begun implementing QR codes into tombstones. In 2014, the Jewish Cemetery of La Paz in Uruguay began implementing QR codes for tombstones.

=== Electronic authentication ===
QR codes can be used to generate time-based one-time passwords for electronic authentication.

=== Loyalty programs ===
QR codes have been used by various retail outlets that have loyalty programs. Sometimes these programs are accessed with a app that is loaded onto a phone and includes a process triggered by a QR code scan. The QR codes for loyalty programs tend to be found printed on the receipt for a purchase or on the products themselves. Users in these schemes collect award points by scanning a code.

=== Counterfeit detection ===
Serialised QR codes have been used by brands and governments to let consumers, retailers and distributors verify the authenticity of the products and help with detecting counterfeit products, as part of a brand protection program. However, the security level of a regular QR code is limited since QR codes printed on original products are easily reproduced on fake products, even though the analysis of data generated as a result of QR code scanning can be used to detect counterfeiting and illicit activity. A higher security level can be attained by embedding a digital watermark or copy detection pattern into the image of the QR code. This makes the QR code more secure against counterfeiting attempts; products that display a code which is counterfeit, although valid as a QR code, can be detected by scanning the secure QR code with the appropriate app.

The treaty regulating apostilles (a seal of authenticity for certain types of documents) has been updated to allow the issuance of digital apostilles by issuing jurisdictions. A digital apostille is a PDF document with a cryptographic signature containing a QR code for a canonical URL of the original document, allowing users to verify the apostille from a printed version of the document.

=== Product tracing ===
QR codes conveying labelling information and their use as part of a food traceability system via access from a smartphone with a QR code scanning app. If QR codes are serialised, consumers can access a web page showing the supply chain for each ingredient, as well as information specific to each related batch, including meat processors and manufacturers, which helps address the concerns they have about the origin of their food. Traceability systems can also support food safety and recall efforts by helping identify affected products and improving supply chain transparency.

=== Other uses ===
QR codes are used in some augmented reality systems to determine the positions of objects in 3-dimensional space.

The Sunrise 2027 initiative seeks to facilitate the transition for retailers and other business currently using UPC barcodes to systems using QR codes.

== Risks ==
The only context in which common QR codes can carry executable data is the URL data type. These URLs may host JavaScript code, which can be used to exploit vulnerabilities in applications on the host system, such as the reader, the web browser, or the image viewer, since a reader will typically send the data to the application associated with the data type used by the QR code.

In the case of no software exploits, malicious QR codes combined with a permissive reader can still put a computer's contents and user's privacy at risk. This practice is known as "attagging", a portmanteau of "attack tagging". They are easily created and can be affixed over legitimate QR codes. On a smartphone, the reader's permissions may allow use of the camera, full Internet access, read/write contact data, GPS, read browser history, read/write local storage, and global system changes.

Risks include linking to dangerous web sites with browser exploits, enabling the microphone/camera/GPS, and then streaming those feeds to a remote server, analysis of sensitive data (passwords, files, contacts, transactions), and sending email/SMS/IM messages or packets for DDoS as part of a botnet, corrupting privacy settings, stealing identity, and even containing malicious logic themselves such as JavaScript or a virus. These actions could occur in the background while the user is only seeing the reader opening a seemingly harmless web page. In Russia, a malicious QR code caused phones that scanned it to send premium texts at a fee of $6 each. QR codes have also been linked to scams in which stickers are placed on parking meters and other devices, posing as quick payment options, as seen in Austin, San Antonio and Boston, among other cities across the United States, as well as in Australia. The number of QR codes included in phishing emails rose from 8 million in January 2026 to 19 million in March 2026. QR codes provide a way of circumventing text filters provided by email clients which might otherwise catch harmful URLs.

== Design ==
Unlike the older, one-dimensional barcodes that were designed to be mechanically scanned by a narrow beam of light, a QR code is detected by a two-dimensional digital image sensor and then digitally analyzed by a programmed processor. The processor locates the three finder patterns, each consisting of three superimposed concentric squares of differing contrast at the upper left, upper right and lower left corners of the QR code image, using a smaller square (or multiple squares) near the fourth corner to normalize the image for size, orientation, and angle of viewing. The small dots throughout the QR code are then converted to binary numbers and validated with an error-correcting algorithm.

QR codes storing addresses and URLs may appear in magazines, on signs, on buses, on business cards, or on almost any object about which users might want information. Users with a camera phone equipped with the correct reader application can scan a QR code to display text and contact information, connect to a wireless network, or open a web page in the phone's browser. This act of linking from physical world objects is termed hardlinking or object hyperlinking. QR codes may also be linked to a location to track where a code has been scanned. Either the application that scans the QR code retrieves the geo information by using GPS and cell tower triangulation (aGPS) or the URL encoded in the QR code itself is associated with a location.

QR codes can be used on various mobile device operating systems. While initially requiring the installation and use of third-party apps, both Android and iOS (since iOS 11) devices can now natively scan QR codes, without requiring an external app to be used. The camera app can scan and display the kind of QR code along with the link. These devices support URL redirection, which allows QR codes to send metadata to existing applications on the device.

=== Information capacity ===
The amount of data that can be represented by a QR code symbol depends on the data type (mode, or input character set), version (1, ..., 40, indicating the overall dimensions of the symbol, i.e. 4 × version number + 17 dots on each side), and error correction level. The maximum storage capacities occur for version 40 and error correction level L (low), denoted by 40-L:

Maximum character storage capacity (40-L) Character refers to individual values of the input mode (data type).
Input mode	Max. characters	Bits/char.	Possible characters, default encoding
Numeric only	7,089	3 1/3	0, 1, 2, 3, 4, 5, 6, 7, 8, 9
Alphanumeric	4,296	5 1/2	0–9, A–Z (upper-case only), space, $, %, *, +, -, ., /, :
Binary/byte	2,953	8	ISO/IEC 8859-1
Kanji/kana	1,817	13	Shift JIS X 0208

Here are some samples of QR codes:

Version 1 (21×21). Content: "Ver1".

Version 2 (25×25). Content: "Version 2".

Version 3 (29×29). Content: "Version 3 QR Code".

Version 4 (33×33). Content: "Version 4 QR Code, up to 50 char".

Version 10 (57×57). Content: "VERSION 10 QR CODE, UP TO 174 CHAR AT H LEVEL, WITH 57X57 MODULES AND PLENTY OF ERROR CORRECTION TO GO AROUND. NOTE THAT THERE ARE ADDITIONAL TRACKING BOXES"

Version 25 (117×117). Content: 1,269 characters of ASCII text describing QR codes.

Version 40 (177×177). Content: "Version 40 QR Code can contain up to 1852 chars ..." (and followed by four paragraphs of ASCII text describing QR codes).

=== Error correction ===
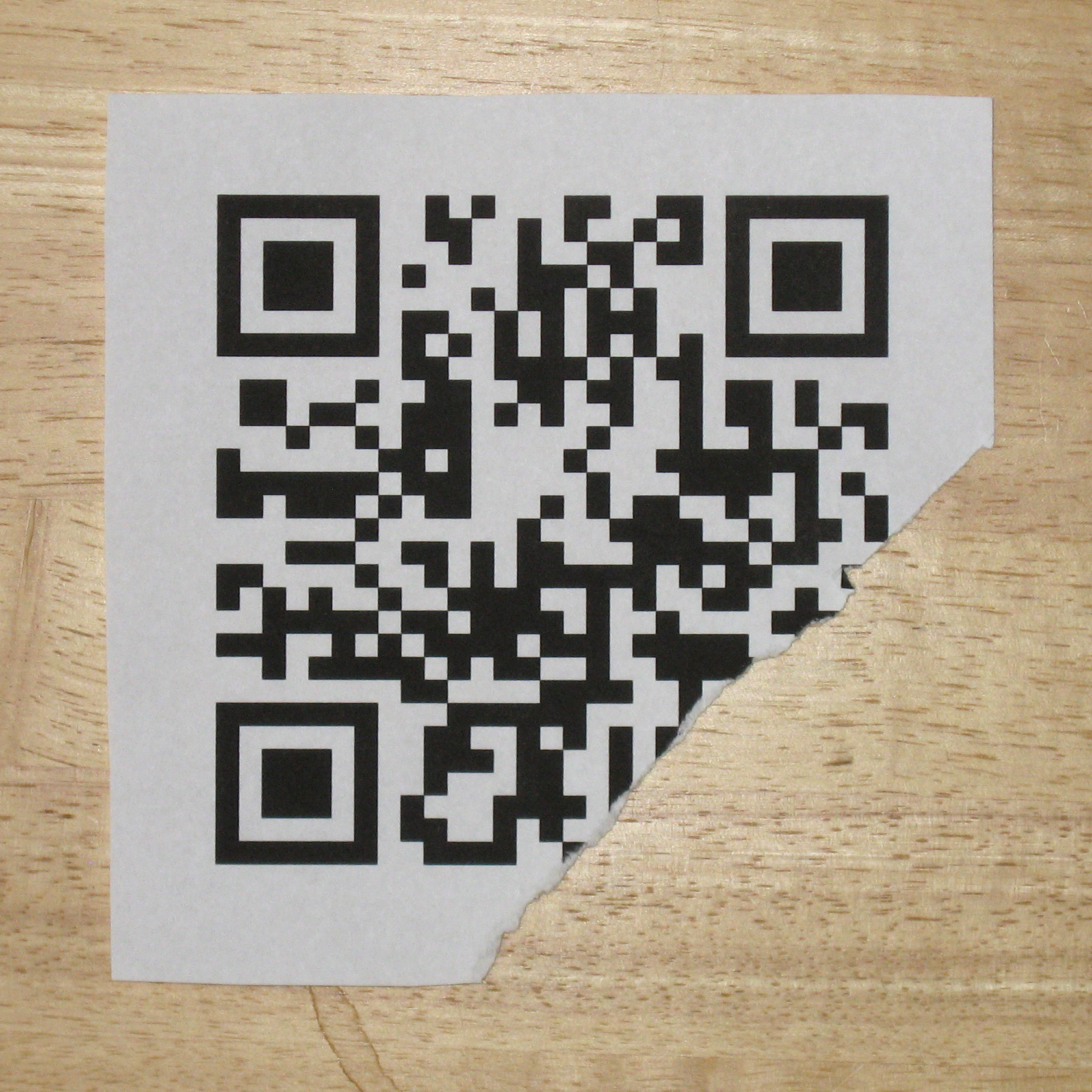
Damaged, torn, and dirty QR code that still scans correctly (linking to en.m.wikipedia.org) due to built-in error correction.

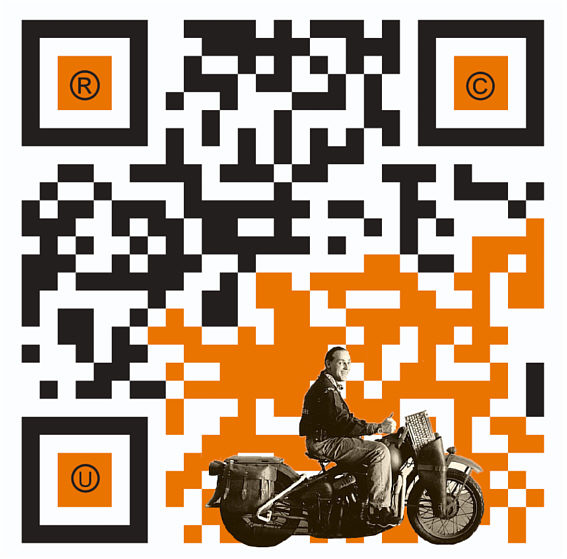
Example of a QR code with artistic embellishment that scans correctly because the scanner treats the central graphic as damaged data and reconstructs the missing modules.

QR codes incorporate Reed–Solomon error correction to ensure that the code remains readable even if it is partially damaged. When Denso Wave originally developed the QR code in 1994 for tracking automotive components through manufacturing plants, paper labels were frequently exposed to oil stains and physical wear that rendered standard one-dimensional barcodes unreadable. Error correction works by generating redundant mathematical backup bytes (called error correction codewords) from the original message and distributing them across the grid alongside the data. When a scanner encounters unreadable squares, it uses these backup bytes to mathematically solve for and reconstruct the missing data.

The QR code standard defines four selectable levels of error correction. Higher levels add more backup data, allowing the code to survive heavier physical damage, but doing so either reduces the amount of user data that can fit inside a given grid size or requires a larger, denser QR code to hold the same message.

QR code error correction levels
Level	Approx. codewords restored	Typical real-world applications
Level L (Low)	~7%	Clean, controlled environments such as digital screens or when maximizing data storage capacity is the top priority.
Level M (Medium)	~15%	Standard default for most consumer uses, including marketing materials and retail food packaging subject to minor scuffs.
Level Q (Quartile)	~25%	Industrial equipment and outdoor signage exposed to weather or rough handling.
Level H (High)	~30%	Harsh industrial environments (such as automotive parts and factory floors) and artistic QR codes where a logo deliberately covers the center of the grid.

==== Damage tolerance and limitations ====
While a Level H QR code can theoretically lose up to 30% of its total codewords and still scan, whether a damaged code actually works in practice depends heavily on where the damage occurs:

- Data vs. functional patterns: Reed–Solomon error correction only protects the data and error-correction region. A QR code relies on fixed structural zones (function patterns), notably the three large square finder patterns in the corners. This allows the scanner to orient and determine the perspective of the grid before decoding begins. Because these elements must be read before error correction can be applied, if damage obliterates one of the corner finder patterns, standard scanners will fail to orient the QR code, even if the total damaged area is well below the code's error-correction threshold.
- Localized vs. scattered damage (interleaving): Real-world damage such as a tear on a cardboard box or a smudge usually destroys a concentrated cluster of squares rather than individual squares scattered evenly across the grid. To prevent a single blemish from destroying an entire section of data, larger QR codes break the message into several smaller Reed–Solomon blocks and interleave (shuffle) their bytes together across the symbol. Because adjacent squares belong to different code blocks, localized damage only corrupts a small fraction of each block, reducing the likelihood that any single block's recovery limit will be overwhelmed.

==== Artistic embellishment ====
Due to error correction, it is possible to create artistic QR codes with embellishments to make them more attractive, and to incorporate company logos and other features directly into the QR code grid. When a logo is placed in the center of a QR code (typically using Level H), the scanner treats the obscured squares under the logo as a damaged area, and uses the remaining backup bytes to reconstruct the "lost" data. However, intentionally covering the center with a logo consumes a large portion of the code's error-correction budget upfront, leaving the printed code much less tolerant to actual real-world damage.

It is also possible to design artistic QR codes without reducing the error correction capacity by manipulating the underlying mathematical constructs (such as appending unused padding bits that arrange into an image) or using generative artificial intelligence to blend light and dark modules into an illustration.

==== Mathematical details ====
QR codes use Reed–Solomon error correction over the finite field $\mathbb{F}_{256}$ or GF(2^{8}), the elements of which are encoded as bytes of 8 bits; the byte $b_7b_6b_5b_4b_3b_2b_1b_0$ with a standard numerical value $\textstyle\sum_{i=0}^7 b_i 2^i$ encodes the field element $\textstyle\sum_{i=0}^7 b_i \alpha^i$ where $\alpha \in \mathbb{F}_{256}$ is taken to be a primitive element satisfying $\alpha^8 + \alpha^4 + \alpha^3 + \alpha^2 + 1 = 0$. The byte-wise modulo-2 primitive polynomial is $x^8 + x^4 + x^3 + x^2 + 1$, corresponding to the decimal polynomial number 285 ($100011101_2$), with initial root = 0 to obtain generator polynomials.

The Reed–Solomon code uses one of 37 different generator polynomials over $\mathbb{F}_{256}$, with degrees ranging from 7 to 68, depending on how many error correction bytes the code adds. It is implied by the form of Reed–Solomon used (systematic BCH view) that these polynomials are all of the form $\prod_{i=0}^{n-1} (x - \alpha^i)$. However, the rules for selecting the degree $n$ are specific to the QR standard.

For example, the generator polynomial used for the Version 1 QR code (21×21), when 7 error correction bytes are used, is: $g(x)= x^7+\alpha^{87}x^6+\alpha^{229}x^5+\alpha^{146}x^4+\alpha^{149}x^3+\alpha^{238}x^2+\alpha^{102}x+\alpha^{21}$.

This is obtained by multiplying the first seven terms: $g(x)=(x+1)(x+\alpha)(x+\alpha^2)(x+\alpha^3)(x+\alpha^4)(x+\alpha^5)(x+\alpha^6)$.

The same may also be expressed using decimal coefficients (over $\mathbb{F}_{256}$), as: $g(x)= x^7+127x^6+122x^5+154x^4+164x^3+11x^2+68x+117$.

The highest power of $x$ in the polynomial (the degree $n$, of the polynomial) determines the number of error correction bytes. In this case, the degree is 7.

When discussing the Reed–Solomon code phase there is some risk for confusion, in that the QR ISO/IEC standard uses the term codeword for the elements of $\mathbb{F}_{256}$, which with respect to the Reed–Solomon code are symbols, whereas it uses the term block for what with respect to the Reed–Solomon code are the codewords. The number of data versus error correction bytes within each block depends on (i) the version (side length) of the QR symbol and (ii) the error correction level. In larger QR symbols, the block size is chosen so that no attempt is made at correcting more than 15 errors per block; this limits the complexity of the decoding algorithm.

As a concrete example, the Version 1 QR symbol with level L error correction consists of a single error correction block with a total of 26 code bytes (made of 19 message bytes and 7 error correction bytes). In standard Reed–Solomon decoding, two error correction bytes are required to correct one corrupted byte at an unknown location, while still-legible modules that are known to be missing (erasures) require only one byte. Furthermore, in certain small block sizes, the ISO/IEC 18004 standard reserves $p$ error correction codewords (where $p = 1, 2, \text{ or } 3$) strictly for error detection to prevent false-positive misreads; in Version 1-L ($p = 3$), 3 of the 7 error correction bytes are reserved for error detection, leaving 4 bytes to correct up to 2 byte errors (7.7% of the 26 total bytes). Hence, this code is designated in the standard as a (26,19,2) error correction code over GF(2^{8}), or in short as a (26,19) code.

=== Encoding ===
==== Format information and masking ====
The format information records two things: the error correction level and the mask pattern used for the symbol. Masking is used to break up patterns in the data area that might confuse a scanner, such as large blank areas or misleading features that look like the locator marks. The mask patterns are defined on a grid that is repeated as necessary to cover the whole symbol. Modules corresponding to the dark areas of the mask are inverted. The 5-bit format information is protected from errors with a BCH code, and two complete copies are included in each QR symbol. A (15,5) triple error-correcting BCH code over GF(2^{4}) is used, having the generator polynomial $g(x)=x^{10}+x^8+x^5+x^4+x^2+x+1$. It can correct at most 3 bit errors out of the 5 data bits. There are a total of 15 bits in this BCH code (10 bits are added for error correction). This 15-bit code is itself X-ORed with a fixed 15-bit mask pattern (101010000010010) to prevent an all-zero string.

==== Error correction bytes ====
To obtain the error correction (EC) bytes for a message "www.wikipedia.org", the following procedure may be carried out:

The message is 17 bytes long; hence it can be encoded using a (26,19,2) Reed-Solomon code to fit in a Ver1 (21×21) symbol, which has a maximum capacity of 19 bytes (for L-level error correction).

The generator polynomial specified for the (26,19,2) code is: $g(x)= x^7+127x^6+122x^5+154x^4+164x^3+11x^2+68x+117$, which may also be written in the form of a matrix of decimal coefficients:

[1 127 122 154 164 11 68 117]

The 17-byte-long message "www.wikipedia.org" as hexadecimal coefficients (ASCII values), denoted by M1 through M17 is:

[77 77 77 2E 77 69 6B 69 70 65 64 69 61 2E 6F 72 67]

The encoding mode is "Byte encoding". Hence the 'Enc' field is [0100] (4 bits). The length of the above message is 17 bytes; hence the 'Len' field is [00010001] (8 bits). The 'End' field is the end-of-message marker [0000] (4 bits).

The message code word (without EC bytes) is of the form:

['Enc' 'Len' w w w . w i k i p e d i a . o r g 'End']

Substituting the hexadecimal values, it can be expressed as:

[4 11 77 77 77 2E 77 69 6B 69 70 65 64 69 61 2E 6F 72 67 0]

This is rearranged as 19-byte blocks of 8 bits each:

[41 17 77 77 72 E7 76 96 B6 97 06 56 46 96 12 E6 F7 26 70]

Using the procedure for Reed-Solomon systematic encoding, the 7 EC bytes obtained (E1 through E7, as shown in the symbol) which are the coefficients (in decimal) of the remainder after polynomial division are:

[174 173 239 6 151 143 37]

or in hexadecimal values:

[AE AD EF 06 97 8F 25]

These 7 EC bytes are then appended to the 19-byte message. The resulting coded message has 26 bytes (in hexadecimal):

[41 17 77 77 72 E7 76 96 B6 97 06 56 46 96 12 E6 F7 26 70 AE AD EF 06 97 8F 25]

Note: The bit values shown in the Ver1 QR symbol below do not match the above values, as the symbol has been masked using a mask pattern (001).

==== Message placement ====
The message dataset is placed from right to left in a zigzag pattern, as shown below. In larger symbols, this is complicated by the presence of the alignment patterns and the use of multiple interleaved error-correction blocks.

Meaning of format information. In the above figure, the format information is protected by a (15,5) BCH code, which can correct up to 3 bit errors. The total length of the code is 15 bits, of which 5 are data bits (2 EC level + 3 mask pattern) and 10 are extra bits for error correction. The format mask pattern for these 15 bits is: [101010000010010]. Note that we map the masked values directly to their meaning here, in contrast to image 4 "Levels & Masks" where the mask pattern numbers are the result of putting the 3rd to 5th mask bit, [101], over the 3rd to 5th format info bit of the QR code.

Message placement within a Ver 1 QR symbol (21×21). The message is encoded using a (255,248) Reed Solomon code (shortened to (26,19) code by using "padding") that can correct up to 2-byte errors. A total of 26 code-words consist of 7 error-correction bytes and 17 data bytes, in addition to the "Len" (8 bit field), "Enc" (4 bit field), and "End" (4 bit field). The symbol is capable of level L error correction. The EC level is 01(L), and the mask pattern is 001. Hence the first 5 bits of the format information are 01001 (without the format mask). After masking, the 5 bits become 11100, as seen here.

Larger symbol (Ver 3, 29×29) illustrating interleaved blocks. The message has 26 data bytes and is encoded using two Reed-Solomon code blocks. Each block is a (255,233) Reed Solomon code (shortened to a (35,13) code), which can correct up to 11-byte errors in a single burst, containing 13 data bytes and 22 error-correction bytes appended to the data bytes. The two 35-byte Reed-Solomon code blocks are interleaved (resulting in a total of 70 code bytes), so it can correct up to 22-byte errors. The symbol achieves level H error correction.

The general structure of a QR encoding is as a sequence of 4-bit indicators with payload length dependent on the indicator mode (e.g. byte encoding payload length is dependent on the first byte).

Encoding modes
Mode indicator	Description	Meaning	Typical structure '[ type : sizes in bits ]'
1 = 0b0001	Numeric	Numeric encoding (10 bits per 3 digits)	[0001 : 4] [ Character Count Indicator : variable ] [ Data Bit Stream : 3 1/3 × charcount ]
2 = 0b0010	Alphanumeric	Alphanumeric encoding (11 bits per 2 characters)	[0010 : 4] [ Character Count Indicator : variable ] [ Data Bit Stream : 5 1/2 × charcount ]
4 = 0b0100	Byte encoding	Byte encoding (8 bits per character)	[0100 : 4] [ Character Count Indicator : variable ] [ Data Bit Stream : 8 × charcount ]
8 = 0b1000	Kanji encoding	Kanji encoding (13 bits per character)	[1000 : 4] [ Character Count Indicator : variable ] [ Data Bit Stream : 13 × charcount ]
3 = 0b0011	Structured append	Structured append (used to split a message across multiple QR symbols)	[0011 : 4] [ Symbol Position : 4 ] [ Total Symbols: 4 ] [ Parity : 8 ]
7 = 0b0111	ECI	Extended Channel Interpretation (select alternate character set or encoding)	[0111 : 4] [ ECI Assignment number : variable ]
5 = 0b0101	FNC1 in first position	FNC1 in first position (see Code 128 for more information)	[0101 : 4] [ Numeric/Alphanumeric/Byte/Kanji payload : variable ]
9 = 0b1001	FNC1 in second position	FNC1 in second position	[1001 : 4] [ Application Indicator : 8 ] [ Numeric/Alphanumeric/Byte/Kanji payload : variable ]
0 = 0b0000	End of message	End of message (Terminator)	[0000 : 4]

Note:
- Character Count Indicator depends on how many modules are in a QR code (Symbol Version).
- ECI Assignment number Size:
  - 8 × 1 bits if ECI Assignment Bitstream starts with '0'
  - 8 × 2 bits if ECI Assignment Bitstream starts with '10'
  - 8 × 3 bits if ECI Assignment Bitstream starts with '110'

Encoding modes can be mixed as needed within a QR symbol. (e.g., a URL with a long string of alphanumeric characters )

[ Mode Indicator][ Mode bitstream ] --> [ Mode Indicator][ Mode bitstream ] --> etc... --> [ 0000 End of message (Terminator) ]

After every indicator that selects an encoding mode is a length field that tells how many characters are encoded in that mode. The number of bits in the length field depends on the encoding and the symbol version.

Number of bits in a length field (Character Count Indicator)
Encoding	Ver. 1–9	10–26	27–40
Numeric	10	12	14
Alphanumeric	9	11	13
Byte	8	16	16
Kanji	8	10	12

Alphanumeric encoding mode stores a message more compactly than the byte mode can, but cannot store lowercase letters and has only a limited selection of punctuation marks, which are sufficient for rudimentary web addresses. Two characters are coded in an 11-bit value by this formula:

V = 45 × C_{1} + C_{2}

This has the exception that the last character in an alphanumeric string with an odd length is read as a 6-bit value instead.

Alphanumeric character codes
Code	Character	Code	Character	Code	Character	Code	Character	Code	Character
00	0	09	9	18	I	27	R	36	Space
01	1	10	A	19	J	28	S	37	$
02	2	11	B	20	K	29	T	38	%
03	3	12	C	21	L	30	U	39	*
04	4	13	D	22	M	31	V	40	+
05	5	14	E	23	N	32	W	41	-
06	6	15	F	24	O	33	X	42	.
07	7	16	G	25	P	34	Y	43	/
08	8	17	H	26	Q	35	Z	44	:

== Standards ==
Structure of a QR code (version 7), highlighting functional elements

Several standards cover the encoding of data as QR codes:

- October 1997 – AIM (Association for Automatic Identification and Mobility) International
- January 1999 – JIS X 0510
- June 2000 – ISO/IEC 18004:2000 Information technology – Automatic identification and data capture techniques – Bar code symbology – QR code (now withdrawn)
  Defines QR code models 1 and 2 symbols.
- 1 September 2006 – ISO/IEC 18004:2006 Information technology – Automatic identification and data capture techniques – QR Code 2005 bar code symbology specification (now withdrawn)
  Defines QR code 2005 symbols, an extension of QR code model 2. Does not specify how to read QR code model 1 symbols, or require this for compliance.
- 1 February 2015 – ISO/IEC 18004:2015 Information – Automatic identification and data capture techniques – QR Code barcode symbology specification (now withdrawn)
  Renames the QR Code 2005 symbol to QR Code and adds clarification to some procedures and minor corrections. It was withdrawn and updated to 18004:2024 in August 2024, which optimizes encoding efficiency, improves error correction, and refines structured append functionality.
- May 2022 – ISO/IEC 23941:2022 Information technology – Automatic identification and data capture techniques – Rectangular Micro QR Code (rMQR) bar code symbology specification
  Defines the requirements for Micro QR Code.
- August 2024 – ISO/IEC 18004:2024 Information technology — Automatic identification and data capture techniques — QR code bar code symbology specification

At the application layer, there is some variation between most of the implementations. Japan's NTT DoCoMo has established de facto standards for the encoding of URLs, contact information, and several other data types. The open-source "ZXing" project maintains a list of QR code data types.

== Variants ==
=== Model 1 ===
Model 1 QR code is an older version of the specification. It is visually similar to the widely seen model 2 codes, but lacks alignment patterns. Differences are in the bottom right corner, and in the midsections of the bottom and right edges are additional functional regions.

Model 1 QR code example

Model 1 QR code functional regions

=== Micro QR code ===
Micro QR code is a smaller version of the QR code standard for applications where symbol size is limited. There are four different versions (sizes) of Micro QR codes: the smallest is 11×11 modules and can only hold 5 numeric characters; the largest can hold 35 numeric characters, or 21 ASCII alphanumeric characters, or 15 bytes (120 bits).

Micro QR code example

Micro QR code functional regions

=== Rectangular Micro QR Code ===
Rectangular Micro QR Code (also known as rMQR Code) is a two-dimensional (2D) matrix barcode invented and standardized in 2022 by Denso Wave as ISO/IEC 23941. rMQR Code is designed as a rectangular variation of the QR code and has the same parameters and applications as original QR codes; however, rMQR Code is more suitable for rectangular areas, and has a difference between width and height up to 19 in the R7x139 version.

Rectangular Micro QR Code (rMQR Code) example

=== iQR code ===
iQR code is an alternative to existing square QR codes developed by Denso Wave. iQR codes can be created in square or rectangular formations; this is intended for situations where a longer and narrower rectangular shape is more suitable, such as on cylindrical objects. iQR codes can fit the same amount of information in 30% less space. There are 61 versions of square iQR codes, and 15 versions of rectangular codes. For squares, the minimum size is 9 × 9 modules; rectangles have a minimum of 19 × 5 modules. iQR codes add error correction level S, which allows for 50% error correction. iQR Codes had not been given an ISO/IEC specification as of 2015, and only proprietary Denso Wave products could create or read iQR codes.

iQR code example

=== Frame QR ===
Frame QR is a variant of the QR code standard which arranges the code in a frame around a central empty area. It is intended to be used in applications where an image, artwork, or branding is desired to be part of the code. It is a distinct code variant and is unrelated to the use of the standard QR code's error correction to insert artwork.

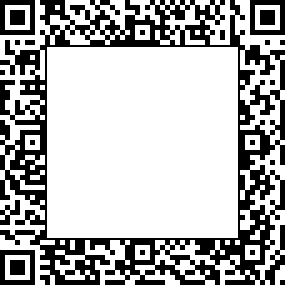
Frame QR example

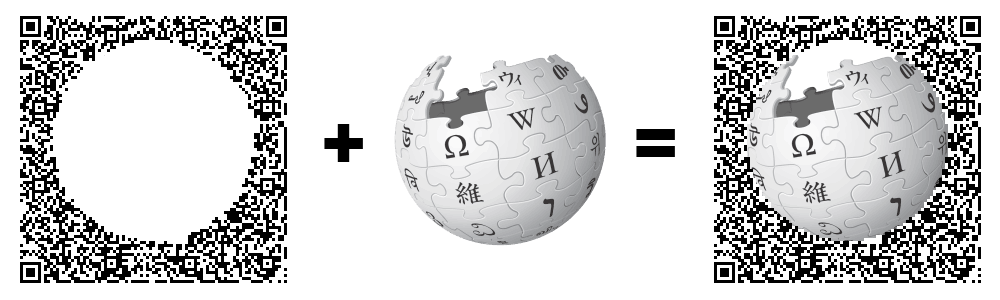
Frame QR code example with a circular frame and the Wikipedia logo composed into its interior

=== tQR ===
tQR (also known as tQR code) is a QR code specially designed for rail transport to distinguish between the different opening and closing positions of platform screen doors, which vary depending on rolling stock. The initial "t" stands for "toughness" and "train". It has an outer frame, and its main feature is that it can be restored even if up to 50% of data bytes is missing. It was jointly developed by Denso Wave and the Tokyo Metropolitan Bureau of Transportation. It is stuck to the outside of the doors of rolling stock and stores the train composition number and the car number. The tQR reader installed on the platform detects the position of tQR, which allows it to detect the opening and closing of doors and the movement of rolling stock. If it is easily readable, it could be exploited for mischief, so it is not compatible with existing QR codes and cannot be read by standard cameras on smartphones or other devices.

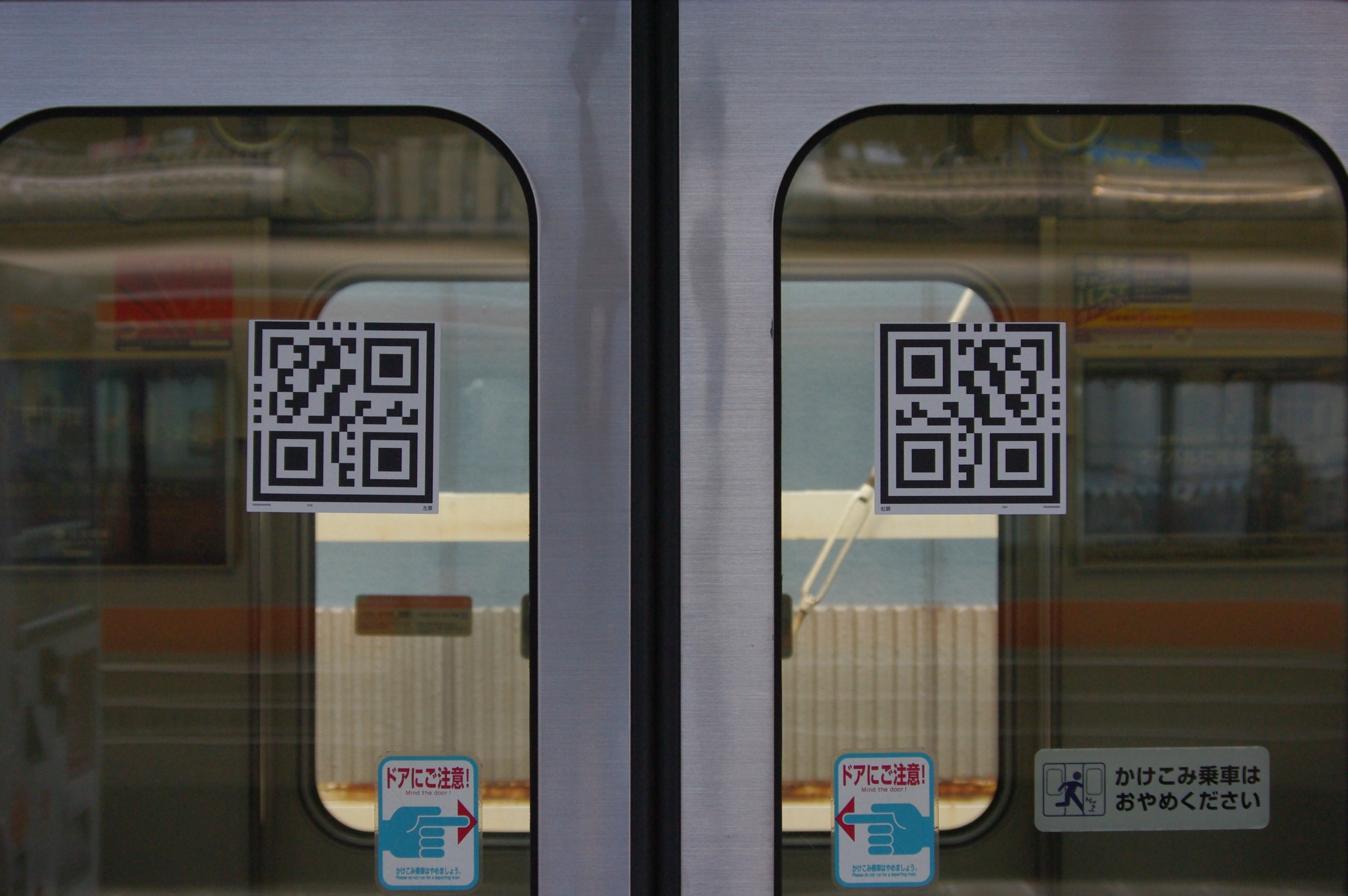
tQR stuck to the door of rolling stock

== License ==
The use of QR code technology is freely licensed as long as users follow the standards for QR code documented with JIS or ISO/IEC. Non-standardized codes may require special licensing.

Denso Wave owns a number of patents on QR code technology, but has chosen to exercise them in a limited fashion. To promote widespread usage of the technology Denso Wave chose to waive its rights to a key patent in its possession for standardized codes only. In the US, the granted QR code patent, 5726435, expired on March 14, 2015. In Japan, the corresponding patent, 2938338, expired on March 14, 2014. The European Patent Office granted patent 0672994 to Denso Wave, which was then validated into French, UK, and German patents, all of which expired in March 2015.

The text QR Code itself is a registered trademark and wordmark of Denso Wave Incorporated. In UK, the trademark is registered as E921775, the term QR Code, with a filing date of 3 September 1998. The UK version of the trademark is based on the Kabushiki Kaisha Denso (DENSO CORPORATION) trademark, filed as Trademark 000921775, the term QR Code, on 3 September 1998 and registered on 16 December 1999 with the European Union OHIM (Office for Harmonization in the Internal Market). The U.S. Trademark for the term QR Code is Trademark 2435991 and was filed on 29 September 1998 with an amended registration date of 13 March 2001, assigned to Denso Corporation. In South Korea, trademark application filed on 18 November 2011 was refused on 20 March 2012, because the Korean Intellectual Property Office viewed that the phrase was genericized among South Korean people to refer to matrix barcodes in general.

== Other 2-D barcodes ==
Other 2-D barcodes have been developed, and some are in wide use:

- Aztec Code
- Data Matrix
- High Capacity Color Barcode
- MaxiCode
- NaviLens
- PDF417

== See also ==
- QRpedia
- SPARQCode
- Touchatag

== Bibliography ==
=== Current ===
ISO/IEC 18004:2024. Information technology. Automatic identification and data capture techniques. QR code bar code symbology specification.
Published: 2024-10-31. Retrieved: 2026-06-14.

=== Withdrawn ===
- BS ISO/IEC 18004:2006. Information technology. Automatic identification and data capture techniques. Bar code symbology. QR Code. Geneva: ISO/IEC. 2000. p. 114. OCLC 60816353.
- BS ISO/IEC 18004:2006. Information technology. Automatic identification and data capture techniques. QR Code 2005 bar code symbology specification. London: BSI. 2007. p. 126. ISBN 978-0-580-67368-9.
