= SPARQCode =

Type of barcode

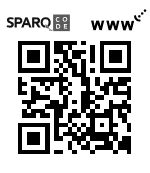
SPARQCode for the URL of the sparqcode.com main page

A SPARQCode is a matrix code (or two-dimensional bar code) encoding standard that is based on the physical QR Code definition created by Japanese corporation Denso-Wave.

== Overview ==
The QR Code standard as defined by Denso-Wave in ISO/IEC 18004 covers the physical encoding method of a binary data stream. However, the Denso-Wave standard lacks an encoding standard for interpreting the data stream on the application layer for decoding URLs, phone numbers, and all other data types. NTT Docomo has established de facto standards for encoding some data types such as URLs, and contact information in Japan, but not all applications in other countries adhere to this convention as listed by the open-source project "zxing" for QR Code data types.

== Encoding standards ==
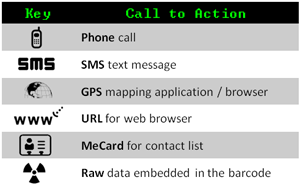
SPARQCode Pictograms, highlighting embedded data type.

The SPARQCode encoding standard specifies a convention for the following encoding data types.

- E-mail address
- Phone Number
- SMS TEXT
- MAP
- URL
- BIZCARD
- MeCard
- vCard
- BlackBerry PIN
- Geographic information
- Google Play link
- Wifi Network config for Android
- YouTube URI
- iCalendar

The SPARQCode convention also recommends but does not require the inclusion of visual pictograms to denote the type of encoded data.

== License ==
The use of the SPARQCode is free of any license. The term SPARQCode itself is a trademark of MSKYNET, but has chosen to open it to be royalty-free.
