= High Capacity Color Barcode =

Type of matrix barcode

An example of a High Capacity Color Barcode: a Microsoft Tag referring to the HCCB article on the English Wikipedia

High Capacity Color Barcode (HCCB) is a technology developed by Microsoft for encoding data in a 2D "barcode" using clusters of colored triangles instead of the square pixels conventionally associated with 2D barcodes or QR codes. Data density is increased by using a palette of 4 or 8 colors for the triangles, although HCCB also permits the use of black and white when necessary. It has been licensed by the ISAN International Agency for use in its International Standard Audiovisual Number standard, and serves as the basis for the Microsoft Tag mobile tagging application.

The technology was created by Gavin Jancke, an engineering director at Microsoft Research. Quoted by BBC News in 2007, he said that HCCB was not intended to replace conventional barcodes. "'It's more of a 'partner' barcode", he said. "The UPC barcodes will always be there. Ours is more of a niche barcode where you want to put a lot of information in a small space."

== Technology ==
HCCB uses a grid of colored triangles to encode data. Depending on the target use, the grid size (total number of symbols), symbol density (the printed size of the triangles), and symbol count (number of colors used) can be varied. HCCB can use an eight-, four-, or two-color (black-and-white) palette. Microsoft claims that laboratory tests using standard off-the-shelf printers and scanners have yielded readable eight-color HCCBs equivalent to approximately 3,500 characters per square inch.

== Microsoft Tag ==
Microsoft Tag logo indicating compatibility

Microsoft Tag is a discontinued but still available implementation of High Capacity Color Barcode (HCCB) using 4 colors in a 5 x 10 grid. Additionally, the code works in monochrome. The print size can be varied to allow reasonable reading by a mobile camera phone; for example, a Tag on a real estate sign might be printed large enough to be read from a car driving by, whereas a Tag in a magazine could be smaller because the reader would likely be nearer.

A Microsoft Tag is essentially a machine readable web link, analogous to a URL shortening link: when read, the Tag application sends the HCCB data to a Microsoft server, which then returns the publisher's intended URL. The Tag reader then directs the user's mobile browser to the appropriate website. Because of this redirection, Microsoft is also able to track users and provide Tag analytics to publishers.

When the platform was released, creation of tags for both commercial and noncommercial use was free as were the associated analytics. In 2013, the process for creating new accounts was transferred to Scanbuy, which said that "A free plan will also be offered from ScanLife with the same basic features", although additional features may be available at extra cost.

=== Consumer ===
Users can download the free Microsoft Tag reader application to their Internet-capable mobile device with camera, launch the reader and read a tag using their phone’s camera. Depending on the scenario, this triggers the intended content to be displayed. Some GPS-equipped phones can, at the user's option, send coordinate data along with the HCCB data, allowing location-specific information to be returned (e.g. for a restaurant advertisement, a navigational map to the nearest location could be shown).

=== Application ===
The Microsoft Tag application gives people the ability to use a mobile phone's on-board camera to take a picture of a tag, and be directed to information in any form, such as text, vCard, URL, Online Photos, Online Video or contact details for the publisher.

Two-dimensional tags can be used to transform traditional marketing media (for example, print advertising, billboards, packaging and merchandising in stores or on LCDs) into gateways for accessing information online. Tags can be applied as gateways from any type of media to an internet site or online media.

The Microsoft Tag reader application is a free download for an Internet-capable mobile device with a camera. The Microsoft Tag reader is compatible with Internet-capable mobile devices, including many based on the Windows Phone 7, Windows Mobile, BlackBerry, Java, Android, Symbian S60, iPhone and Java ME platforms.

=== Discontinuation ===
On August 19, 2013 Microsoft sent out an email notice that the Microsoft Tag service will be terminated in two years on August 19, 2015. Scanbuy, a company founded in 2000 by Olivier Attia, has been selected to support Microsoft Tag technology on the ScanLife platform beginning September 18, 2013.

== Related technologies ==
- Xerox Parc DataGlyphs are a related technology as they use a barcode like technology to encode data—however it is possible to use color images as the source material.
- Color Construct Code is one of the few other barcode symbologies designed to take advantage of multiple colors. But, instead of encoding a single tag, it is designed to store files including multimedia, possibly along with a URI

== See also ==
- Barcode
- 2D barcode
- CueCat, an earlier technology similar to Microsoft Tag
- JAB Code a color 2D barcode
- NaviLens a color 2D barcode for blind or visually impaired persons
