= Smart data capture =

Technology used to extract and process unstructured information

Smart data capture (SDC), also known as 'intelligent data capture' or 'automated data capture', describes the branch of technology concerned with using computer vision techniques like optical character recognition (OCR), barcode scanning, object recognition and other similar technologies to extract and process information from semi-structured and unstructured data sources. IDC characterize smart data capture as an integrated hardware, software, and connectivity strategy to help organizations enable the capture of data in an efficient, repeatable, scalable, and future-proof way. Data is captured visually from barcodes, text, IDs and other objects - often from many sources simultaneously - before being converted and prepared for digital use, typically by artificial intelligence-powered software. An important feature of SDC is that it focuses not just on capturing data more efficiently but serving up easy-to-access, actionable insights at the instant of data collection to both frontline and desk-based workers, aiding decision-making and making it a two-way process.

Smart data capture automates and accelerates capture, applying insights in real time and automating processes based on extracted input. Smart data capture is designed to be repeatable and scalable to reduce low-level manual tasks and eliminate human error. To achieve this goal, smart data capture solutions are often made available using specialist software installed on commodity hardware such as smartphones. However, some solutions may rely on specialized hardware such as dedicated scanning devices, wearables or shop floor robots.

== Differences from OCR ==
Optical character recognition applications are typically concerned with the actual data capture process; they are intended to faithfully reproduce text, words, letters and symbols from a printed document. Smart data capture is multimodal, capable of extracting data from a wider range of semi-structured and unstructured sources, going beyond basic text recognition to offer a wider scope of applications. By extending functionality to provide actionable insights at the point of capture, SDC is also a two-way process (capture-display), while OCR is more commonly one-way (capture only), primarily used for data input.

Smart data capture solutions typically have two parts:

- Data capture (which includes OCR, barcode scanning, object recognition)
- Functionality that then uses this data to provide actionable insights at the point of capture.

== Applications ==
Smart data capture can be applied to almost any industry and application that requires visual information capture and interpretation. This may include:

- Retail
- Warehouse inventory control
- Logistics, handling and shipping
- Manufacturing
- Field service
- Healthcare
- Transport and travel
- Fraud detection

== Notes ==
Historically, PriceWaterhouseCoopers described smart data capture as a combination of robotic process automation and intelligent character recognition. This description is no longer sufficient because it is focused purely on text-based capture systems (automated OCR).

== See also ==
- Automatic identification and data capture
