= ITF-6 =

ITF-6 is the implementation of an Interleaved 2 of 5 (ITF) barcode to encode an addon to ITF-14 and ITF-16 barcodes. Originally was developed as a part of JIS specification for Physical Distribution Center. Instead of ITF-14, it wasn't standardized by ISO Committee but it is widely used to encode additional data to Global Trade Item Number such as items quantity or container weight.

== History ==
In 1983, the Logistics Symbol Committee proposed the Interleaved 2 of 5 barcode as a method to improve the JAN code. In 1985, a logistics symbol JIS drafting committee was set up at the Distribution System Development Center, and the final examination was started toward JIS. Then in 1987 it was standardized as JIS-X-0502, a standard physical distribution barcode symbol ITF-14/16/6.

The ITF barcode has an add-on version for displaying the weight, etc., and it is possible to encode a 5-digits numerical value and 6-th check character as ITF-6 after ITF-14 or ITF-16(obsolete in 2010).

Currently ITF-6 isn't standardized by ISO Committee and it is used only as a part of JIS standards. However, it is widely used by manufacturers to encode additional data and it is supported by wide range of barcode scanners

== Uses ==
Despite the fact that ITF-6 barcode isn't included into ISO standards, it is widely used as add-on to encode items quantity in package or item weight. At this time, it is used only with ITF-14 (Global Trade Item Number), but up to 2010 it was used with standardized only in Japan ITF-16 (Extended Symbology for Physical Distribution).

From the left, ITF-6 contains 5 significant digits and the last one is control digit, which is calculated same way as UPC checksums. If a decimal point is required, the decimal point is between the 3rd and 4th digits:
NNNNN(C/D) - without decimal point;
NNN.NN(C/D) - with decimal point.

ITF-6 is supported by various barcode generating software and barcode scanners.

== Checksum ==
Checksum is calculated as other UPC checksums:
$x_6 = 10 - ((3x_1 + x_2 + 3x_3 + x_4 + 3x_5)\pmod{10})$

Example for the first 5 digits 12345:
10 - ((3*1 + 2 + 3*3 + 4 + 3*5) mod 10) = 7. Check digit is 7.

== See also ==
- Automated identification and data capture (AIDC)
- Barcode
- Global Trade Item Number
- ITF-14
- Interleaved 2 of 5
- Japanese Industrial Standards
