= Barcode =

Optical machine-readable representation of data

A UPC-A barcode

A barcode or bar code is a method of representing data in a visual, machine-readable symbolic form. Initially, barcodes represented data by varying the widths, spacings and sizes of parallel lines. These barcodes, commonly referred to as linear or one-dimensional (1D), can be scanned by optical scanners known as barcode readers. Later, two-dimensional (2D) variants were developed, using rectangles, dots, hexagons and other patterns, called matrix codes or 2D barcodes. Despite being often included as barcodes, these do not use bars as linear barcodes do. These can be read using purpose-built 2D optical scanners.

Both matrix codes and linear barcodes can also be read by a digital camera connected to a computer. After a photograph of the barcode is taken, software is used to analyze the image to deconstruct and decode the code. A mobile device with a built-in camera, such as a smartphone, can function as this type of barcode reader using specialized application software.

The barcode was invented by Norman Joseph Woodland and Bernard Silver and patented in the US in 1952. The invention was based on Morse code that was extended to thin and thick bars. However, it took over twenty years before this invention became commercially successful. UK magazine Modern Railways December 1962 pages 387–389 record how British Railways had already perfected a barcode-reading system capable of correctly reading rolling stock travelling at 100 mph (160 km/h) with no mistakes. An early use of one type of barcode in an industrial context was sponsored by the Association of American Railroads in the late 1960s. Developed by General Telephone and Electronics (GTE) and called KarTrak ACI (Automatic Car Identification), this scheme involved placing colored stripes in various combinations on steel plates which were affixed to the sides of railroad rolling stock. Two plates were used per car, one on each side, with the arrangement of the colored stripes encoding information such as ownership, type of equipment, and identification number. The plates were read by a trackside scanner located, for instance, at the entrance to a classification yard, while the car was moving past. The project was abandoned after about ten years because the system proved unreliable after long-term use.

Barcodes became commercially successful after they were adopted to automate supermarket checkout systems, a task for which they have become almost universal. The Uniform Grocery Product Code Council had chosen, in 1973, the barcode design developed by George Laurer. Laurer's barcode, with vertical bars, printed better than the circular barcode developed by Woodland and Silver. Their use has spread to many other tasks that are generically referred to as automatic identification and data capture (AIDC). The first successful system using barcodes was in the UK supermarket group Sainsbury's in 1972 using shelf-mounted barcodes which were developed by Plessey. In June 1974, Marsh supermarket in Troy, Ohio used a scanner made by Photographic Sciences Corporation to scan the Universal Product Code (UPC) barcode on a pack of Wrigley's chewing gum. QR codes, a specific type of 2D barcode, rose in popularity in the second decade of the 2000s due to the growth in smartphone ownership.

Other systems have made inroads in the AIDC market, but the simplicity, universality and low cost of barcodes has limited the role of these other systems, particularly before technologies such as radio-frequency identification (RFID) became available.

== History ==
In 1948, Bernard Silver, a graduate student at Drexel Institute of Technology in Philadelphia, Pennsylvania, US overheard the president of the local food chain, Food Fair, asking one of the deans to research a system to automatically read product information during checkout. Silver told his friend Norman Joseph Woodland about the request, and they started working on a variety of systems. Their first working system used ultraviolet ink, but the ink faded too easily and was expensive.

Convinced that the system was workable with further development, Woodland left Drexel, moved into his father's apartment in Florida, and continued working on the system. His next inspiration came from Morse code, and he formed his first barcode from sand on the beach. "I just extended the dots and dashes downwards and made narrow lines and wide lines out of them." To read them, he adapted technology from optical soundtracks in movies, using a 500-watt incandescent light bulb shining through the paper onto an RCA935 photomultiplier tube (from a movie projector) on the far side. He later decided that the system would work better if it were printed as a circle instead of a line, allowing it to be scanned in any direction.

On 20 October 1949, Woodland and Silver filed a patent application for "Classifying Apparatus and Method", in which they described both the linear and bull's eye printing patterns, as well as the mechanical and electronic systems needed to read the code. The patent was issued on 7 October 1952, as US Patent 2,612,994. In 1951, Woodland moved to IBM and continually tried to interest IBM in developing the system. The company eventually commissioned a report on the idea, which concluded that it was both feasible and interesting, but that processing the resulting information would require equipment that was some time off in the future.

IBM offered to buy the patent, but the offer was not accepted. Philco purchased the patent in 1962 and then sold it to RCA sometime later.

=== Collins at Sylvania ===
During his time as an undergraduate, David Jarrett Collins worked at the Pennsylvania Railroad and became aware of the need to automatically identify railroad cars. Immediately after receiving his master's degree from MIT in 1959, he started work at GTE Sylvania and began addressing the problem. He developed a system called KarTrak using blue, white and red reflective stripes attached to the side of the cars, encoding a four-digit company identifier and a six-digit car number. Light reflected off the colored stripes was read by photomultiplier vacuum tubes.

The Boston and Maine Railroad tested the KarTrak system on their gravel cars in 1961. The tests continued until 1967, when the Association of American Railroads (AAR) selected it as a standard, automatic car identification, across the entire North American fleet. The installations began on 10 October 1967. However, the economic downturn and rash of bankruptcies in the industry in the early 1970s greatly slowed the rollout, and it was not until 1974 that 95% of the fleet was labeled. To add to its woes, the system was found to be easily fooled by dirt in certain applications, which greatly affected accuracy. The AAR abandoned the system in the late 1970s, and it was not until the mid-1980s that they introduced a similar system, this time based on radio tags.

The railway project had failed, but a toll bridge in New Jersey requested a similar system so that it could quickly scan for cars that had purchased a monthly pass. Then the US Post Office requested a system to track trucks entering and leaving their facilities. These applications required special retroreflector labels. Finally, Kal Kan asked the Sylvania team for a simpler (and cheaper) version which they could put on cases of pet food for inventory control.

=== Computer Identics Corporation ===
In 1967, with the railway system maturing, Collins went to management looking for funding for a project to develop a black-and-white version of the code for other industries. They declined, saying that the railway project was large enough, and they saw no need to branch out so quickly.

Collins then quit Sylvania and formed the Computer Identics Corporation. As its first innovations, Computer Identics moved from using incandescent light bulbs in its systems, replacing them with helium–neon lasers, and incorporated a mirror as well, making it capable of locating a barcode up to a meter (3 feet) in front of the scanner. This made the entire process much simpler and more reliable, and typically enabled these devices to deal with damaged labels, as well, by recognizing and reading the intact portions.

Computer Identics Corporation installed one of its first two scanning systems in the spring of 1969 at a General Motors (Buick) factory in Flint, Michigan. The system was used to identify a dozen types of transmissions moving on an overhead conveyor from production to shipping. The other scanning system was installed at General Trading Company's distribution center in Carlstadt, New Jersey to direct shipments to the proper loading bay.

=== Universal Product Code ===
In 1966 the National Association of Food Chains (NAFC) held a meeting on the idea of automated checkout systems. RCA, which had purchased the rights to the original Woodland patent, attended the meeting and initiated an internal project to develop a system based on the bullseye code. The Kroger grocery chain volunteered to test it.

In the mid-1970s the NAFC established the Ad-Hoc Committee for U.S. Supermarkets on a Uniform Grocery-Product Code to set guidelines for barcode development. In addition, it created a symbol-selection subcommittee to help standardize the approach. In cooperation with consulting firm, McKinsey & Co., they developed a standardized 11-digit code for identifying products. The committee then sent out a contract tender to develop a barcode system to print and read the code. The request went to Singer, National Cash Register (NCR), Litton Industries, RCA, Pitney-Bowes, IBM and many others. A wide variety of barcode approaches was studied, including linear codes, RCA's bullseye concentric circle code, starburst patterns and others.

In the spring of 1971 RCA demonstrated their bullseye code at another industry meeting. IBM executives at the meeting noticed the crowds at the RCA booth and immediately developed their own system. IBM marketing specialist Alec Jablonover remembered that the company still employed Woodland, and he established a new facility in Research Triangle Park to lead development.

In July 1972 RCA began an 18-month test in a Kroger store in Cincinnati. Barcodes were printed on small pieces of adhesive paper, and attached by hand by store employees when they were adding price tags. The code proved to have a serious problem; the printers would sometimes smear ink, rendering the code unreadable in most orientations. However, a linear code, like the one being developed by Woodland at IBM, was printed in the direction of the stripes, so extra ink would simply make the code "taller" while remaining readable. So on 3 April 1973, the IBM UPC was selected as the NAFC standard. IBM had designed five versions of UPC symbology for future industry requirements: UPC A, B, C, D, and E. NCR installed a testbed system at Marsh's Supermarket in Troy, Ohio, near the factory that was producing the equipment. On 26 June 1974, a 10-pack of Wrigley's Juicy Fruit gum was scanned, registering the first commercial use of the UPC.

In 1971 an IBM team was assembled for an intensive planning session, threshing out, 12 to 18 hours a day, how the technology would be deployed and operate cohesively across the system, and scheduling a roll-out plan. By 1973, the team were meeting with grocery manufacturers to introduce the symbol that would need to be printed on the packaging or labels of all of their products. There were no cost savings for a grocery to use it, unless at least 70% of the grocery's products had the barcode printed on the product by the manufacturer. IBM projected that 75% would be needed in 1975.

Economic studies conducted for the grocery industry committee projected over $40 million in savings to the industry from scanning by the mid-1970s. Those numbers were not achieved in that time-frame and some predicted the demise of barcode scanning. The usefulness of the barcode required the adoption of expensive scanners by a critical mass of retailers while manufacturers simultaneously adopted barcode labels. Neither wanted to move first and results were not promising for the first couple of years, with Business Week proclaiming "The Supermarket Scanner That Failed" in a 1976 article.

Sims Supermarkets were the first location in Australia to use barcodes, starting in 1979.

=== Industrial adoption ===
In 1981 the United States Department of Defense adopted the use of Code 39 for marking all products sold to the United States military. This system, Logistics Applications of Automated Marking and Reading Symbols (LOGMARS), is still used by DoD and is widely viewed as the catalyst for widespread adoption of barcoding in industrial uses.

== Use ==
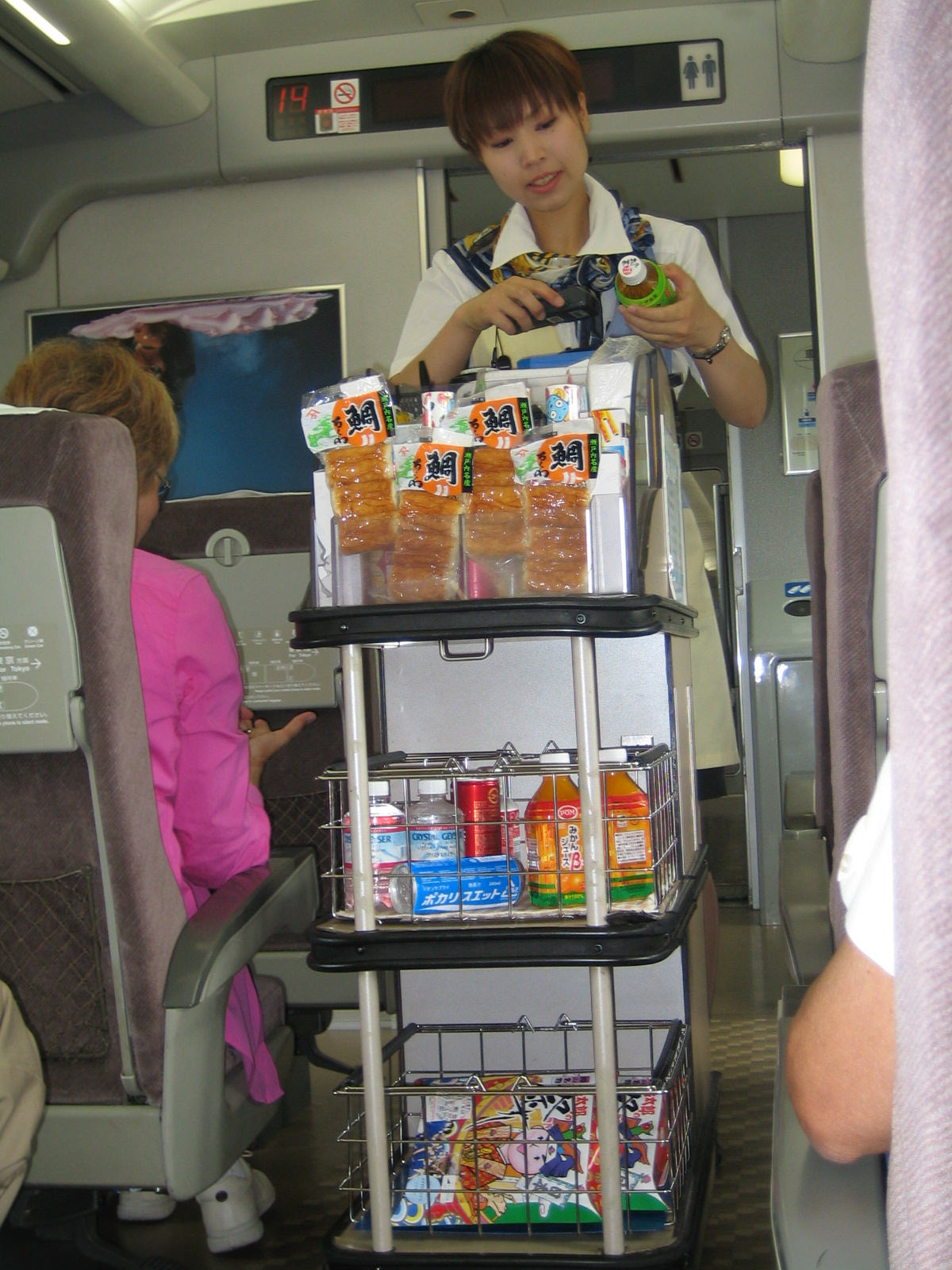
Snack vendor on the Shinkansen train scans a barcode.

EAN-13 ISBN barcode

Barcode on a patient identification wristband

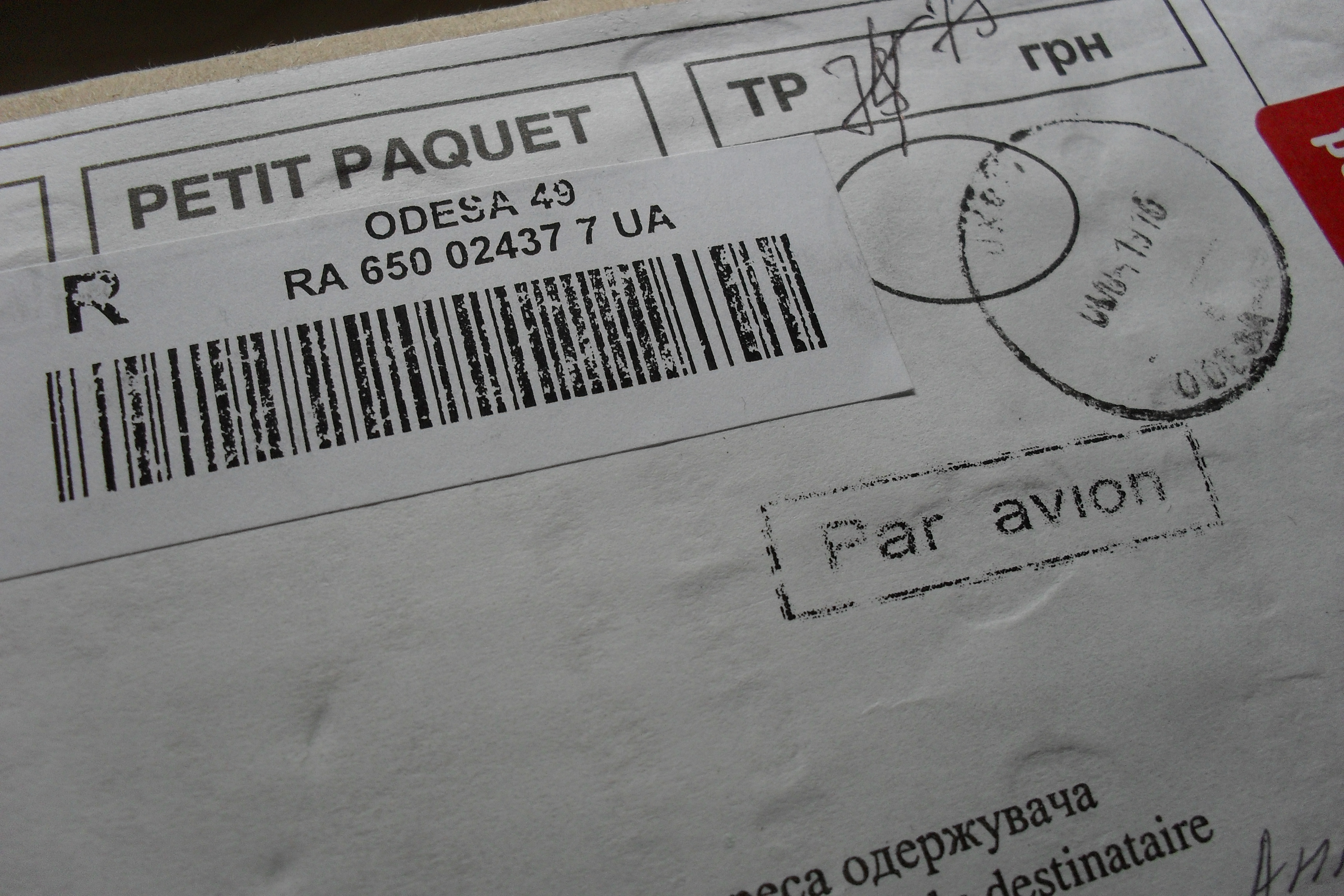
Barcoded parcel

Barcodes are widely used around the world in many contexts. In stores, UPC barcodes are pre-printed on most items other than fresh produce from a grocery store. This speeds up processing at check-outs and helps track items and also reduces instances of shoplifting involving price tag swapping, although shoplifters can now print their own barcodes. Barcodes that encode a book's ISBN are also widely pre-printed on books, journals and other printed materials. In addition, retail chain membership cards use barcodes to identify customers, allowing for customized marketing and greater understanding of individual consumer shopping patterns. At the point of sale, shoppers can get product discounts or special marketing offers through the address or e-mail address provided at registration.

Barcodes are widely used in healthcare and hospital settings, ranging from patient identification (to access patient data, including medical history, drug allergies, etc.) to creating SOAP notes with barcodes to medication management. They are also used to facilitate the separation and indexing of documents that have been imaged in batch scanning applications, track the organization of species in biology, and integrate with in-motion checkweighers to identify the item being weighed in a conveyor line for data collection.

They can also be used to keep track of objects and people; they are used to keep track of rental cars, airline luggage, nuclear waste, express mail, and parcels. Barcoded tickets (which may be printed by the customer on their home printer, or stored on their mobile device) allow the holder to enter sports arenas, cinemas, theatres, fairgrounds, and transportation, and are used to record the arrival and departure of vehicles from rental facilities. By verifying a barcoded ticket against a list of valid tickets, this can allow the identification of duplicate or fraudulent tickets more easily. Barcodes are widely used in shop floor control applications software where employees can scan work orders and track the time spent on a job.

Some ERP, MRP and other inventory management software has built in support for barcode reading. Barcodes can be used to track inventory more quickly than manually noting specific items.

Barcodes are also used in some kinds of non-contact 1D and 2D position sensors. A series of barcodes are used in some kinds of absolute 1D linear encoder. The barcodes are packed close enough together that the reader always has one or two barcodes in its field of view. As a kind of fiducial marker, the relative position of the barcode in the field of view of the reader gives incremental precise positioning, in some cases with sub-pixel resolution. The data decoded from the barcode gives the absolute coarse position. An "address carpet", used in digital paper, such as Howell's binary pattern and the Anoto dot pattern, is a 2D barcode designed so that a reader, even though only a tiny portion of the complete carpet is in the field of view of the reader, can find its absolute X, Y position and rotation in the carpet.

Matrix codes can embed a hyperlink to a web page. A mobile device with a built-in camera might be used to read the pattern and browse the linked website, which can help a shopper find the best price for an item in the vicinity. Since 2005, airlines use an IATA-standard 2D barcode on boarding passes (Bar Coded Boarding Pass (BCBP)), and since 2008 2D barcodes sent to mobile phones enable electronic boarding passes. Some applications for barcodes have fallen out of use. In the 1970s and 1980s, software source code was occasionally encoded in a barcode and printed on paper (Cauzin Softstrip and Paperbyte are barcode symbologies specifically designed for this application), and the 1991 Barcode Battler computer game system used any standard barcode to generate combat statistics. Artists have used barcodes in art, such as Scott Blake's Barcode Jesus, as part of the post-modernism movement.

== Barcode readers ==
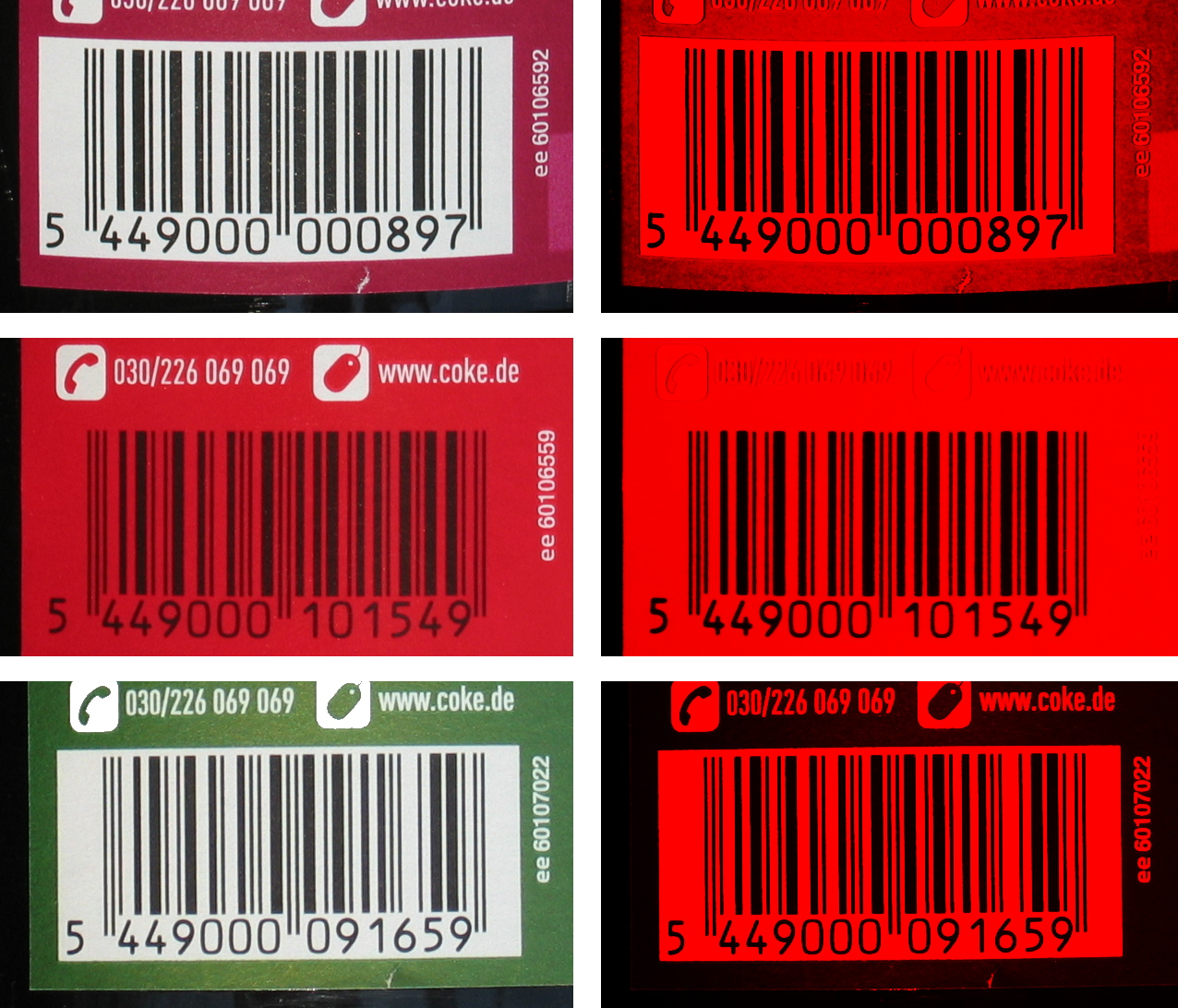
GTIN barcodes on Coca-Cola bottles. The images at right show how the laser of barcode readers "see" the images behind a red filter.

The earliest and cost effective barcode scanners are built from a fixed light and a single photosensor that is manually moved across the barcode.

Computer-connected barcode scanners use a variety of interfaces transfer their data. The oldest barcode scanners communicate over a serial connection using RS-232, which requires special software running on the computer to parsing incoming data from the scanner. Many barcode scanners connect to a computer and send data to a computer as if the barcode's data had been typed on the keyboard, which requires no additional software. These scanners often took the form factor of a "keyboard wedge" and were interposed between a PS/2 or AT keyboard and the computer. Most modern computer-connected barcode scanners connect via USB and appear as a human interface device which behaves like an additional keyboard to input data coming from a barcode.

A wide range of hardware is manufactured for standalone barcode readers by manufacturers such as Datalogic, Intermec, HHP (Hand Held Products), Microscan Systems, Unitech, Metrologic, PSC, and PANMOBIL, and Zebra Technologies (previously Motorola Solutions, which was previously Symbol Technologies).

Most modern smartphones are able to decode barcode using their built-in camera. Google's mobile Android operating system can use their own Google Lens application to scan QR codes, or third-party apps like Barcode Scanner to read both one-dimensional barcodes and QR codes. Google's Pixel devices can natively read QR codes inside the default Pixel Camera app. Nokia's Symbian operating system featured a barcode scanner, while mbarcode is a QR code reader for the Maemo operating system. In Apple iOS 11, the native camera app can decode QR codes and can link to URLs, join wireless networks, or perform other operations depending on the code's contents. Other paid and free apps are available with scanning capabilities for other symbologies or for earlier iOS versions. With BlackBerry devices, the App World application can natively scan barcodes and load any recognized Web URLs on the device's Web browser. Windows Phone 7.5 is able to scan barcodes through the Bing search app. However, these devices are not designed specifically for the capturing of barcodes. As a result, they do not decode nearly as quickly or accurately as a dedicated barcode scanner or portable data terminal.

== Quality control and verification ==
It is common for producers and users of bar codes to have a quality management system which includes verification and validation of bar codes. Barcode verification examines the quality of the barcode in comparison to industry standards and specifications. Barcode verifiers are primarily used by businesses that print and use barcodes. Any trading partner in the supply chain can test barcode quality. It is important to verify a barcode to ensure that any reader in the supply chain can successfully interpret a barcode with a low error rate. Retailers levy large penalties for non-compliant barcodes that they receive. These chargebacks can reduce a barcode manufacturer's revenue by 2% to 10%.

A barcode verifier works the way a reader does, but instead of simply decoding a barcode, a verifier performs a series of tests. These include several measurements of different contrast parameters, proper spacing of elements, and ability to be decoded, including when errors are introduced. In 2D barcodes, uniformity against an ideal grid is also measured.

Compared with a reader, the measurement must be repeatable and consistent. Doing so requires constant conditions such as distance, illumination angle, sensor angle and verifier aperture. Based on the verification results, the production process can be adjusted to print higher quality barcodes.

Bar code validation may include evaluations after use for reliability against sunlight, abrasion, impact, and moisture.

== Types of barcodes ==
=== Linear barcodes ===
A linear barcode is a one dimensional form that is made up of lines and spaces of various widths or sizes that create specific patterns.

These bar codes may be divided by the following attributes:

- Discrete vs. continuous. In discrete bar codes, there is a non-coding gap between symbols, usually a minimum-width space, so symbols consist of k bars and k−1 spaces. In continuous bar codes, all element widths are significant.
- Two-width vs. multi-width. Simple bar codes have only two choices for each element, usually "narrow" and "wide" widths for each bar or space, with the wide elements being between 2 to 3 times the width of the narrow. Alternatively, some post office codes use the height of a bar, or its absence, to distinguish two types. More complex encodings use multiple element widths, usually 1, 2, 3, or 4 times a basic "module" width.

Example	Symbology	Continuous or discrete	Bar type	Uses
	Codabar	Discrete	Two	Old format used in libraries and blood banks and on airbills (out of date, but still widely used in libraries)
	Code 25 – Non-interleaved 2 of 5	Continuous	Two	Industrial
	Code 25 – Interleaved 2 of 5	Continuous	Two	Wholesale, libraries International standard ISO/IEC 16390
	Code 11	Discrete	Two	Telephones (out of date)
	Farmacode or Code 32	Discrete	Two	Italian pharmacode – use Code 39 (no international standard available)
	Code 39	Discrete	Two	Various – international standard ISO/IEC 16388
	Code 93	Continuous	Many	Various
	Code 128	Continuous	Many	Various – International Standard ISO/IEC 15417
	Data Logic 2 of 5	Discrete	Two	Datalogic 2 of 5 can encode digits 0–9 and was used mostly in Chinese Postal Services.
	EAN 2	Continuous	Many	Addon code (magazines), GS1-approved – not an own symbology – to be used only with an EAN/UPC according to ISO/IEC 15420
	EAN 5	Continuous	Many	Addon code (books), GS1-approved – not an own symbology – to be used only with an EAN/UPC according to ISO/IEC 15420
	EAN-8, EAN-13	Continuous	Many	Worldwide retail, GS1-approved – International Standard ISO/IEC 15420
|| | ||	Facing Identification Mark	Discrete	Two	USPS business reply mail
	GS1-128 (formerly named UCC/EAN-128), incorrectly referenced as EAN 128 and UCC 128	Continuous	Many	Various, GS1-approved – just an application of the Code 128 (ISO/IEC 15417) using the ANS MH10.8.2 AI Datastructures. It is not a separate symbology.
	GS1 DataBar, formerly Reduced Space Symbology (RSS)	Continuous	Many	Various, GS1-approved
	IATA 2 of 5	Discrete	Two	IATA 2 of 5 version of Industrial 2 of 5 is used by International Air Transport Association had fixed 17 digits length with 16 valuable package identification digit and 17-th check digit.
	Industrial 2 of 5	Discrete	Two	Industrial 2 of 5 can encode only digits 0–9 and at this time has only historical value.
	ITF-14	Continuous	Two	Non-retail packaging levels, GS1-approved – is just an Interleaved 2/5 Code (ISO/IEC 16390) with a few additional specifications, according to the GS1 General Specifications
	ITF-6	Continuous	Two	Interleaved 2 of 5 barcode to encode an addon to ITF-14 and ITF-16 barcodes. The code is used to encode additional data such as items quantity or container weight
	JAN	Continuous	Many	Used in Japan, similar to and compatible with EAN-13 (ISO/IEC 15420)
	Matrix 2 of 5	Discrete	Two	Matrix 2 of 5 can encode digits 0–9 and was uses for warehouse sorting, photo finishing, and airline ticket marking.
	MSI	Continuous	Two	Used for warehouse shelves and inventory
	Pharmacode	Discrete	Two	Pharmaceutical packaging (no international standard available)
	Plessey	Continuous	Two	Catalogs, store shelves, inventory (no international standard available)
	Telepen	Continuous	Two	Libraries (UK)
	Universal Product Code (UPC-A and UPC-E)	Continuous	Many	Worldwide retail, GS1-approved – International Standard ISO/IEC 15420

=== Bar height codes ===
These codes consist of bars of uniform width, but varying in height. These are all discrete codes, as the spaces between bars are uniform and do not convey information. These codes are popular in postal applications.

Example	Symbology	Bar type	Uses
	Australia Post barcode	4 bar heights	An Australia Post 4-state barcode as used on a business reply paid envelope and applied by automated sorting machines to other mail when initially processed in fluorescent ink.
	Intelligent Mail barcode	4 bar heights	United States Postal Service, replaces both POSTNET and PLANET symbols (formerly named OneCode)
	Japan Post barcode	4 bar heights	Japan Post
	KarTrak ACI	4 bar colours	Used in North America on railroad rolling equipment. Bars are distinguished by colour rather than height, but it is otherwise similar to a bar-height code.
	PLANET	Tall/short	United States Postal Service (no international standard available)
	PostBar	4 bar heights	Canadian Post office
	POSTNET	Tall/short	United States Postal Service (no international standard available)
	RM4SCC / KIX	4 bar heights	Royal Mail / PostNL
	RM Mailmark C	4 bar heights	Royal Mail
	RM Mailmark L	4 bar heights	Royal Mail
	Spotify codes	8 bar heights	Spotify codes point to artists, songs, podcasts, playlists, and albums. 37 bits of information, 8 bits of CRC, and 15 Forward error correction bits are encoded in the heights of 20 of the 23 bars. As long as the bar heights are maintained, the code may be handwritten or vary in color. Patented under EP 3444755.

Many of these may be thought of as stacked 2D bar codes, with a central "clock" row where all bars are present, flanked by top and bottom rows where some bars are absent.

=== Stacked 2D barcodes ===
Stacked 2D barcodes consist of multiple rows of linear bar codes. The rows are not fully independent, but are mostly read in sequence, like lines of print.

Example	Symbology	Continuous or discrete	Bar type	Uses
	Codablock	Continuous	Many	Codablock is a family of stacked 1D barcodes (in some cases counted as stacked 2D barcodes) which are used in health care industry (HIBC).
	Code 49	Continuous	Many	Various
	Code 16K	Continuous	Many	Used to identify chips and printed circuit boards, as well as in medical applications.
	DX film edge barcode	Neither	Tall/short	Color print film

=== Matrix (2D) codes ===
A matrix code or a 2D code is a two-dimensional visual method to represent information. It can represent more data per unit area than a one-dimensional barcode. Various different patterns are used to encode data.

Example	Name	Notes
	App Clip Code	Apple-proprietary code for launching "App Clips", a type of applet. 5 concentric rings of three colors (light, dark, middle).
	AR Code	A type of marker used for placing content inside augmented reality applications. Some AR Codes can contain QR codes inside, so that AR content can be linked to. See also ARTag.
	Aztec Code	Designed by Andrew Longacre at Welch Allyn (now Honeywell Scanning and Mobility). Public domain. – International Standard: ISO/IEC 24778
	Bokode	A Data Matrix code in which the code is stored on a small photomask and backlit. When viewed with a camera focused to infinity, the code is visible. The emitter can be many times smaller than the equivalent printed code.
	Boxing	A high-capacity 2D code is used on piqlFilm by Piql AS
	Cauzin Softstrip	Softstrip code was used in the 1980s to encode software, which could be transferred by special scanners from printed journals into computer hardware. It was later renamed Datastrip.
	CyberCode	CyberCode is a visual tagging system using 2D barcodes, designed for recognition by standard cameras, enabling the identification and 3D positioning of tagged objects. Its design incorporates visual fiduciary markers, allowing computers to determine both the identity and orientation of objects, making it suitable for augmented reality applications. However, its data capacity is limited to 24 bits, restricting the amount of information each tag can convey. From Sony.
	DataGlyphs	From Palo Alto Research Center (also termed Xerox PARC). Patented. DataGlyphs can be embedded into a half-tone image or background shading pattern in a way that is almost perceptually invisible, similar to steganography.
	Data Matrix	From Microscan Systems, formerly RVSI Acuity CiMatrix/Siemens. Public domain. Increasingly used throughout the United States. Single segment Data Matrix is also termed Semacode. – International Standard: ISO/IEC 16022.
	Dolby Digital	Digital sound code for printing on cinematic film between the threading holes
	DotCode	Standardized as ISS DotCode Symbology Specification 4.0. Public domain. Extended 2D replacement of Code 128 barcode. At this time is used to track individual cigarette and pharmaceutical packages.
	Han Xin code	Code designed to encode Chinese characters, invented in 2007 by Chinese company The Article Numbering Center of China, introduced by Association for Automatic Identification and Mobility in 2011 and published as ISO/IEC 20830:2021 in 2021.
	High Capacity Color Barcode	HCCB was developed by Microsoft; licensed by ISAN-IA.
	JAB Code	Just Another Bar Code is a colored 2D Code. Square or rectangle. License free.
	MaxiCode	Used by United Parcel Service. Now public domain.
	Messenger Codes	Proprietary ring-shaped code for Facebook Messenger. Defunct as of 2019, replaced by standard QR codes.
	Micro QR code	Micro QR code is a smaller version of the QR code standard for applications where symbol size is limited.
	Micro PDF417	MicroPDF417 is a restricted size barcode, similar to PDF417, which is used to add additional data to linear barcodes.
	NaviLens	NaviLens is a colour matrix barcode intended to help blind and visually impaired people find their way around railway and subway stations, museums, libraries, and other public spaces.
	Nintendo e-Reader dot code	Developed by Olympus Corporation to store songs, images, and mini-games for Game Boy Advance on Nintendo e-Reader cards.
	PDF417	Originated by Symbol Technologies. Public domain. – International standard: ISO/IEC 15438
	QR code	Initially developed, patented and owned by Denso Wave for automotive components management; they have chosen not to exercise their patent rights. Can encode Latin and Japanese Kanji and Kana characters, music, images, URLs, emails. De facto standard for most modern smartphones. Used with BlackBerry Messenger to pick up contacts rather than using a PIN code. The most frequently used type of code to scan with smartphones, and one of the most widely used 2D Codes. Public domain. – International standard: ISO/IEC 18004
	Rectangular Micro QR Code (rMQR Code)	Rectangular extension of QR Code Originated by Denso Wave. Public domain. – International standard: ISO/IEC 23941
	ShotCode	Circular pattern codes for camera phones. Originally from High Energy Magic Ltd in name Spotcode. Before that most likely termed TRIPCode.
	Snapcode, also called Boo-R code	Used by Snapchat, Spectacles, etc. US9111164B1
	SPARQCode	QR code encoding standard from MSKYNET, Inc.
	WeChat Mini Program code	A circular code with outward-projecting lines.

== In popular culture ==
In architecture, a building in Lingang New City by German architects Gerkan, Marg and Partners incorporates a barcode design, as does a shopping mall called Shtrikh-kod (Russian for barcode) in the Nevskiy district of St. Petersburg, Russia. In media, in 2011, the National Film Board of Canada and ARTE France launched a web documentary entitled Barcode.tv, which allows users to view films about everyday objects by scanning the product's barcode with their iPhone camera. In professional wrestling, the WWE stable D-Generation X incorporated a barcode into their entrance video, as well as on a T-shirt. In video games, the protagonist of the Hitman video game series has a barcode tattoo on the back of his head, QR codes can be scanned in a side mission in Watch Dogs, and Judgment features QR Codes that protagonist can photograph with his phone camera to unlock upgrades.

== Decorative barcodes ==
Some companies integrate custom designs into barcodes on their consumer products without impairing their readability.

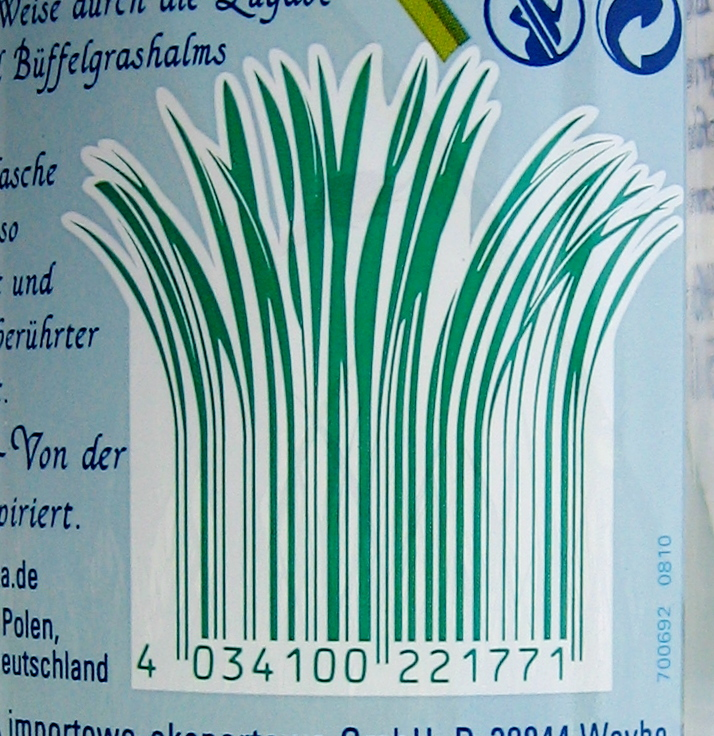

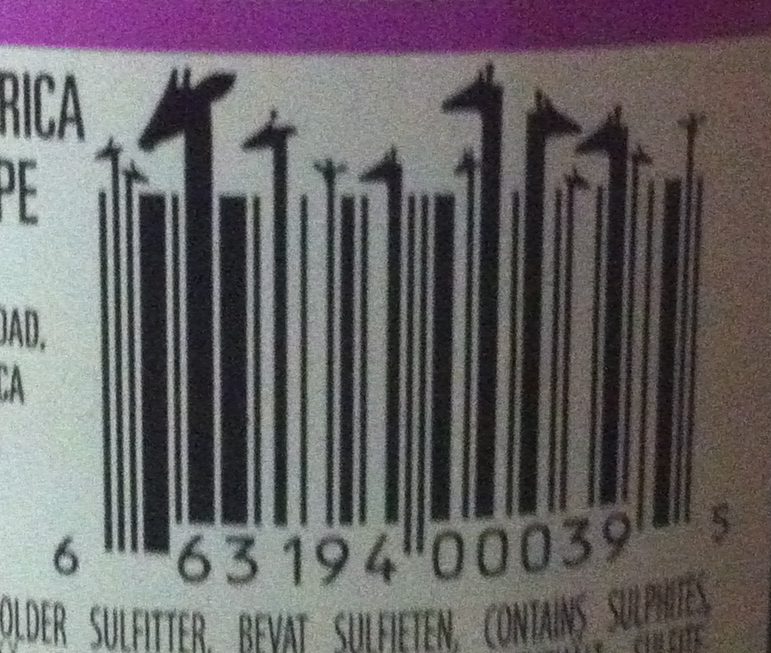

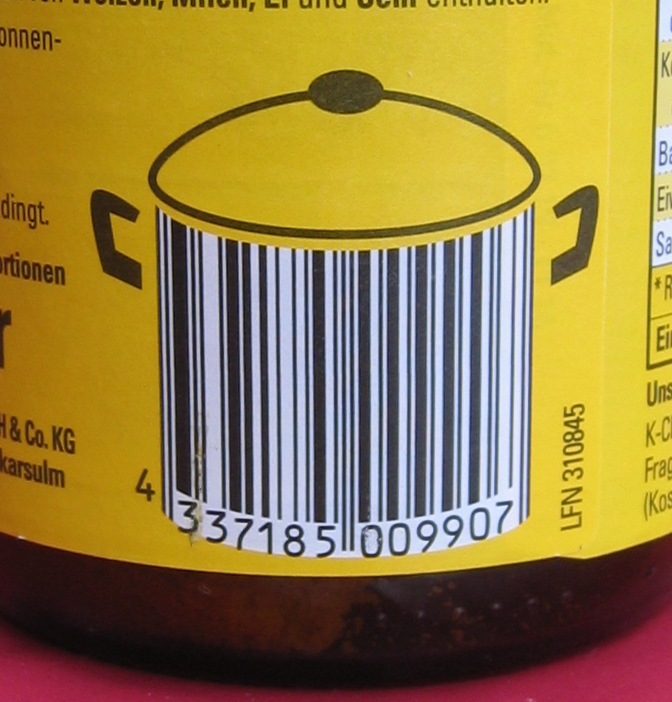

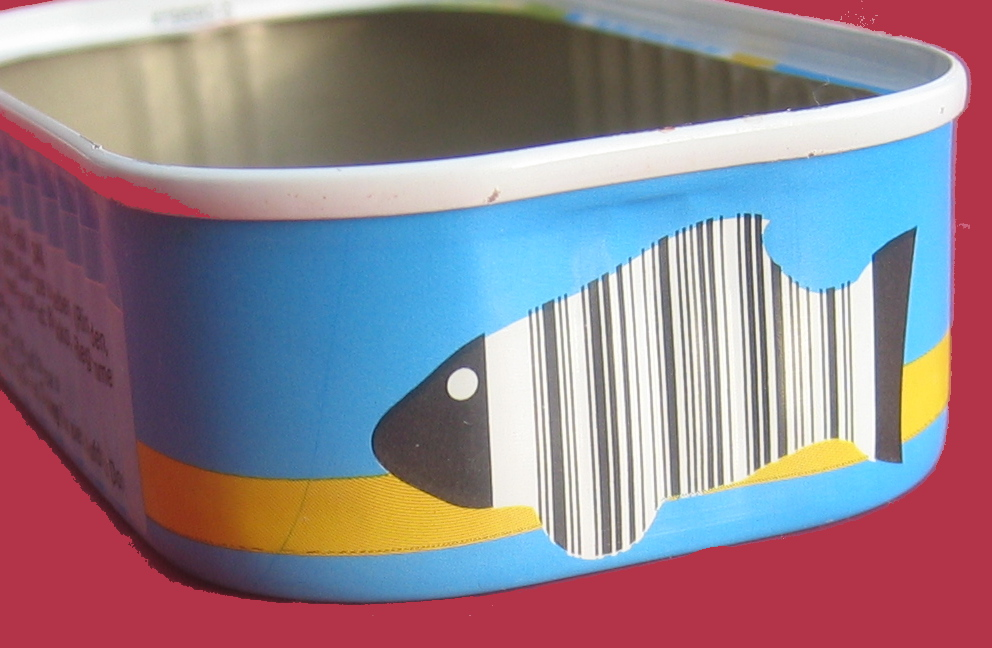

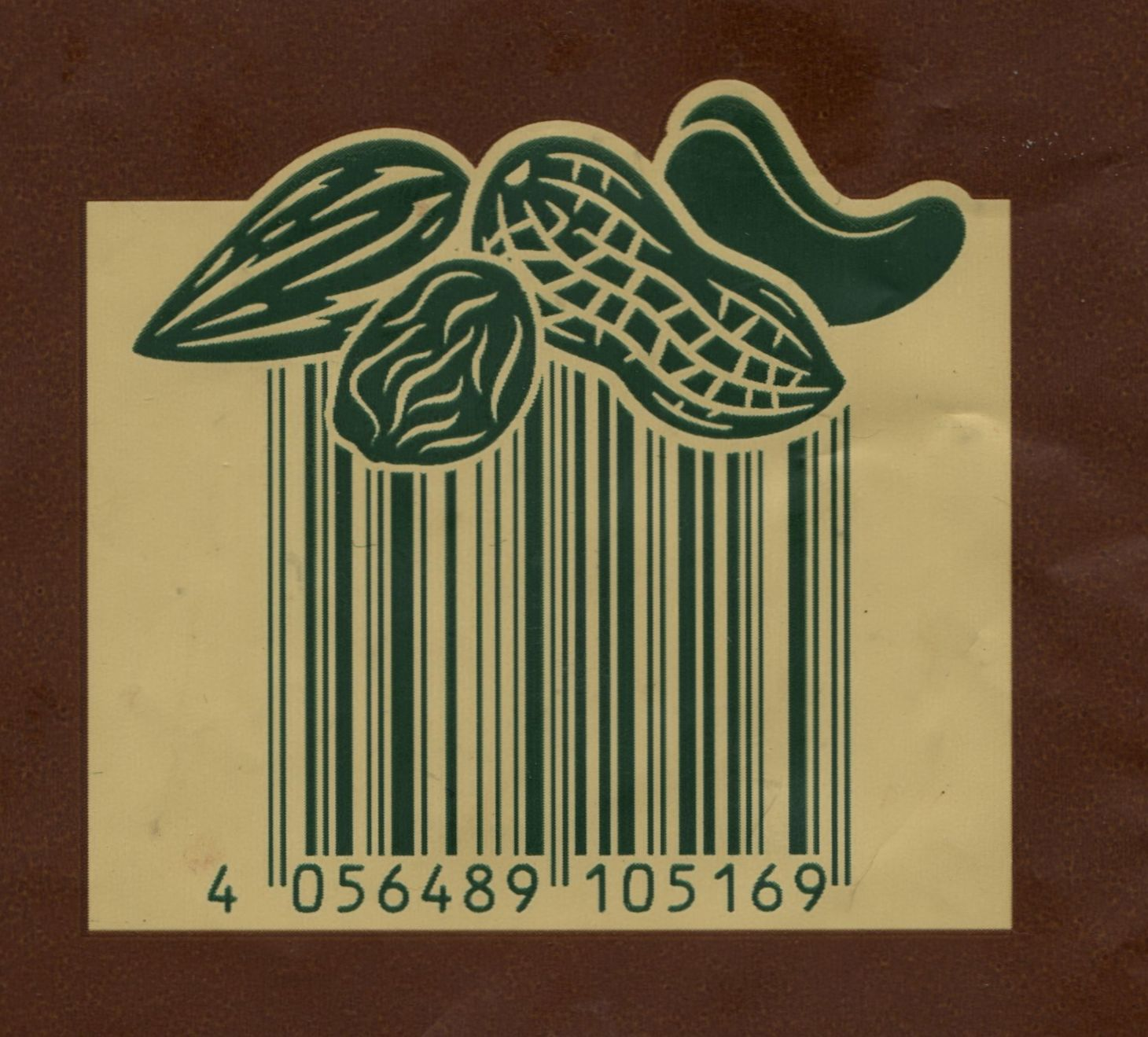

== Opposition ==
Television host Phil Donahue described barcodes as a "corporate plot against consumers". Old Believers (a separation of the Russian Orthodox Church) and some Christian fundamentalists believe barcodes are a manifestation of the Number of the beast.

== See also ==
- Automated identification and data capture (AIDC)
- Barcode printer
- CueCat
- Campus card
- European Article Numbering-Uniform Code Council
- Global Trade Item Number
- Identifier
- Inventory control system
- Object hyperlinking
- Semacode
- SPARQCode (QR code)
- List of GS1 country codes
