= Snapcodes =

Proprietary QR code system used in Snapchat

Snapcode

Classification
- Type: Proprietary scannable code

Snapcodes are proprietary two-dimensional barcode images used by the social-media platform Snapchat to add friends, open web pages, unlock lenses and perform other in-app actions. Historically, each Snapcode was a yellow square containing a central Ghost logo ringed by black dots that encode a unique identifier, however in late 2022 the Snapcode was updated to be a traditional QR code with a yellow background and black stylised dots, featuring the users Bitmoji avatar instead of the Ghost - these updated Snapcodes link to the web address of the profile directly and can be scanned using any QR Code reader. Scanning the image with the Snapchat camera triggers the associated action, avoiding the need to type usernames or URLs.

== History ==
Snapcodes debuted in Snapchat on 27 January 2015 alongside the Discover content hub. The feature was built on technology from Utah-based QR start-up Scan, Inc., which Snap had quietly acquired for about US$50–54 million in late 2014.

Within months Snapchat said “millions of Snapcodes are scanned each week,” reflecting rapid adoption.

=== Feature expansions ===
- Animated profile GIFs (September 2015): tapping a personal Snapcode lets a user record a looping five-frame selfie that replaces the ghost icon.
- Vector downloads (May 2015): users gained the option to export high-resolution SVG files of their Snapcode for posters and merchandise.
- Website Snapcodes (31 January 2017): Snapchat added custom codes that open any URL inside its in-app browser, a move The Verge said would put “Snapcodes everywhere” in advertising.
- Codes can also unlock hidden AR lenses, geofilters or Discover channels.

== Design and technology ==
Snapcodes borrow the visual grammar of the QR code but use a proprietary dot pattern readable only by Snapchat. The central ghost cut-out can display a selfie or brand logo without affecting scannability. All decoding occurs on-device; Snap has not published the specification.

== Usage and adoption ==
Acting as Snapchat’s equivalent of a follow button, Snapcodes are shared on social profiles, business cards, billboards and even concert screens. Brands such as McDonald’s and Coca-Cola have printed them on packaging. Wired credited Snapcodes with reviving mainstream interest in QR technology in the United States.

=== Influence ===
Competing services later introduced similar scannable profile codes, including Facebook Messenger, Instagram (Nametags) and Venmo.

== Patents ==
Snap holds several United States patents covering the dot pattern and customization of Snapcodes, among them:

- US 9,111,164 – “Custom functional patterns for optical barcodes” (2015)
- US 9,911,073 – “Facial patterns for optical barcodes” (2018)

== See also ==
- Scan (company)
- QR code
- Augmented reality
