= Code 16K =

Multi-row barcode format

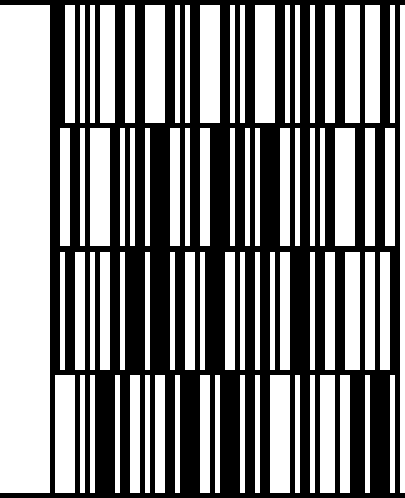
- Language: English
- Created by: Ted Williams
- Standard: AIM-BC7-2000 Uniform Symbology Specification - Code 16K
- Based on: Code 128

Code 16K is a multi-row barcode format developed by Ted Williams at the American company Laserlight Systems in 1989. In the US and France, the code is used in the electronics industry for tagging chips and printed circuit boards. In the US, it has also been utilized in various medical settings.

== Structure ==
The code is based on the structure of the Universal Product Code and Code 128. 77 ASCII characters or 154 digits can be encoded on an area of 2.4 cm^{2}. Each symbol is composed of two to sixteen rows separated by a horizontal bar. Rows contain exactly five ASCII characters, padded with placeholder characters, containing the following:

- leading quiet zone
- start character
- guard bar
- five symbol characters
- stop character
- trailing quiet zone

The first and final horizontal row separators of a symbol are longer than the others, as they extend to the end of the leading and trailing quiet zones. The range of legal characters in each row is determined by one of three character sets:

- A: uppercase alphanumeric, punctuation marks, eleven special characters, and control characters (00–95)
- B: mixed case alphanumeric, punctuation marks, and eleven special characters (32–127)
- C: numeric digit pairs (00–99)

A symbol can switch between these as needed. To ensure a high level of error security, Code 16K offers three forms of error detection:

- The parity is checked for each character.
- Each line is recognized indirectly via the display of a start/stop character
- Two checksum characters are appended at the end of the code. With an extended decoder, the code can be identified by all conventional readers. Before decoding, the entire block of code must have been captured.

== Sources ==
- Lenk, Bernhard (30 September 2002). Handbuch der Automatischen Identifikation 2. 2D-Codes (in German). Lenk Monika Fachbuchverla. ISBN 9783935551014.
- BARCODAT: 2D-Code-Fibel. 5th edition. BARCODAT, Dornstetten 2007, online (PDF; 4.35 MB), archive link retrieved on 11 May 2022.
