= ShotCode =

Type of polar matrix barcode

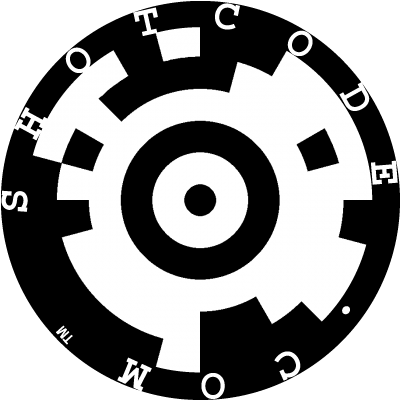
Sample ShotCode linking to this article.

ShotCode is a circular barcode created by High Energy Magic of Cambridge University. It uses a dartboard-like circle, with a bullseye in the centre and datacircles surrounding it. The technology reads databits from the datacircles by measuring the angle and distance from the bullseye for each point.

ShotCodes are designed to be read with a regular camera (including those found on mobile phones and webcams) without the need to purchase other specialised hardware. ShotCodes differ from matrix barcodes in that they do not store regular data - rather, they store a look up number consisting of 40 bits of data. This needs to link to a server that holds information regarding a mapped URL which the reading device can connect to in order to download said data.

== History ==
ShotCode was created in 1999 at the University of Cambridge when researching a low cost vision based method to track locations and developed TRIPCode as a result. It has been used to track printed TRIPCode paperbadges in realtime with webcams. After that in Cambridge it had another research use; to read barcodes with mobile phone cameras, and they used TRIPCode in a round barcode which was named SpotCode. High Energy Magic was founded in 2003 to commercialise research from the University of Cambridge Computer Laboratory and Laboratory for Communications Engineering. Least Bango.net, a mobile company used SpotCode 2004 in their ads. In 2005 High Energy Magic Ltd. sold the entire SpotCode IPR to OP3. Afterwards the name was changed from SpotCode to ShotCode. Heineken was the first company to officially use the ShotCode technology.

== ShotCode software ==
The software used to read a ShotCode captured by a mobile camera is called ‘ShotReader’. It is lightweight and is only around 17kB. It ‘reads’ the camera’s picture of a ShotCode in real time and prompts browsers to navigate to a particular site.

No official software meant to be used on Android or iOS smartphones exists.

== See also ==
- QR Code
- Semacode
- SPARQCode
