= Cauzin Softstrip =

Barcode format

Cauzin Softstrip reader and StripWare media

Cauzin Softstrip was a two-dimensional barcode format intended for paper data storage, allowing magazines to distribute computer programs by printing a barcode which stored the program. The barcodes were printed initially in BYTE's October 1985 issue as a "printing experiment" and later publicly introduced in November 1985 at COMDEX.

Softstrip barcodes encoded less than a thousand bytes per square inch, a result being that large files would occupy a large surface area in a magazine. The barcodes didn't work well if the magazine ink was smeared; and the reader hardware was relatively expensive at around $200.

In addition to publishing Softstrips in magazines, Cauzin distributed software to retailers across the US via standalone Softstrip cards under the name StripWare.

== Reception ==
"The system works beautifully", David Tebbutt of Personal Computer World wrote in January 1987, "but, at the UK price of £200, I'm having a devil of a job deciding who could justify the price". He concluded that until a compelling business use appeared for it, Softstrip was "'all dressed up, with nowhere to go'".

== See also ==
- QR codes
