= Health Industry Business Communications Council =

Health Industry Business Communications Council (HIBCC)
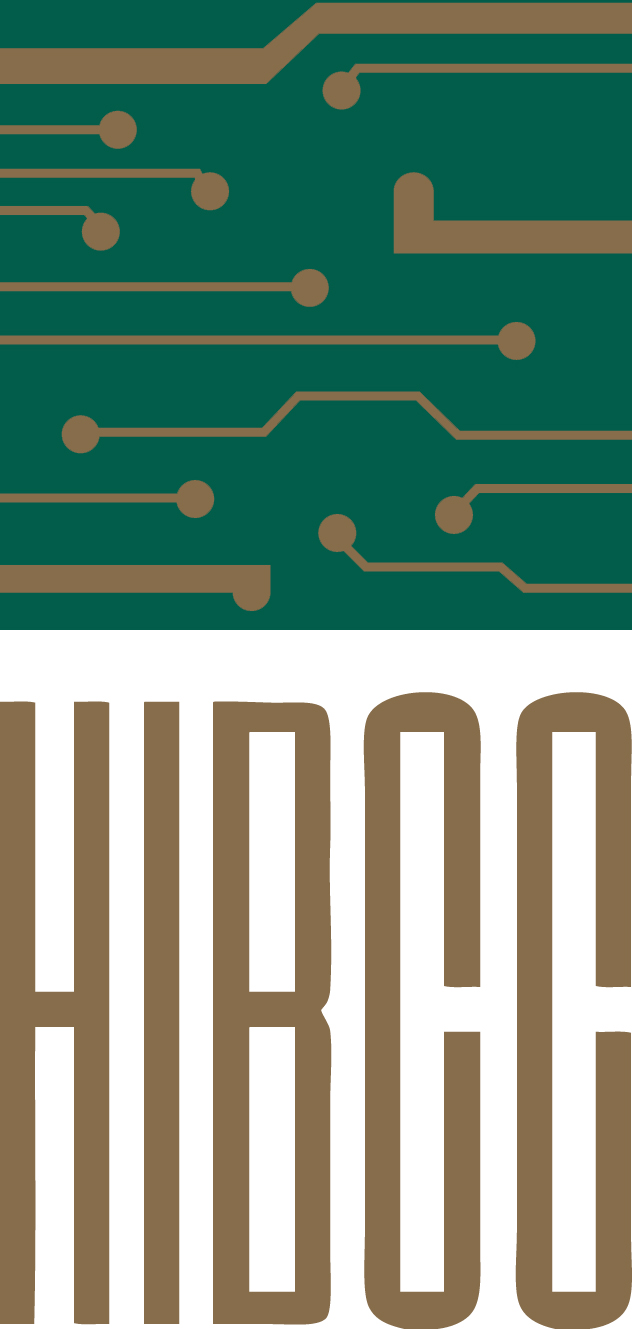
- Type: Nonprofit Organization
- Industry: Health Industry Standards
- Founded: 1983
- Headquarters: United States
- Website: www.hibcc.org

The Health Industry Business Communications Council (HIBCC) is an internationally accredited standards development organization serving the healthcare supply chain. Its scope includes global Unique Device Identification (UDI)-compliant Automatic Identification (auto-ID) labeling standards and Health Industry Number (HIN) location identifiers for chargeback/rebate tracking, class of trade determination, pharmaceutical traceability requirements, and electronic commerce.

== History ==
The Health Industry Business Communications Council (HIBCC), an industry-sponsored and supported non-profit organization, was founded in 1983 to develop a standard for data transfer using uniform bar code labeling.

Bar code technology had already proven a valuable tool for reducing costs and human error in other industries, such as retail. In health care, the potential was even greater because of the impact errors can have on the quality of patient care.

The mandate to develop the Health Industry Bar Code (HIBC) Standard grew out of a task force composed of numerous health care trade organizations.

HIBCC was originally formed to administer the Standard and issue Labeler Identification Codes (LICs) which identify individual manufacturers and are included within each auto-ID symbol.

== Activities ==
HIBCC’s scope has evolved from its original mandate to address broader aspects of healthcare data exchange, while maintaining its longstanding focus on patient and product safety. This includes establishing electronic data interchange (EDI) message formats, barcode and automatic identification labeling standards, universal numbering systems, and maintaining databases that ensure the use of common identifiers.

HIBCC’s major activities include:

• Standardized manufacturer, customer, and product identification codes, including the Labeler Identification Code (LIC) and the Health Industry Number (HIN)

• The Health Industry Bar Code (HIBC) Standards

• Computerized EDI protocols in ASC X12 approved message formats

• Participation in national and international organizations working to further enhance electronic communications standards.

== Health Industry Bar Code (HIBC) Supplier Labeling Standard (SLS) ==
HIBCC administers the Health Industry Bar Code Supplier Labeling Standard (HIBC SLS), an international standard for healthcare product identification and Automatic Identification and Data Capture (AIDC). Its purpose is to provide a unique and consistent way to identify products globally throughout the healthcare supply chain. The HIBC SLS is accredited by the American National Standards Institute (ANSI) in the US and in Europe by the European Committee for Standardization (CEN).

Key Characteristics of the HIBC SLS

Alphanumeric Character Set

The HIBC SLS accommodates alphanumeric bar codes. The ten numeric characters (0-9) and twenty-six alpha characters (A-Z) of an alphanumeric data structure combine to provide a greater set of possible identifiers.

Variable Length Fields

The HIBC SLS supports variable-length fields of up to 18 alphanumeric characters, enabling elements such as product/catalog codes, lot/batch numbers, and serial numbers to be directly encoded.

Consistent data format through each packaging level

The HIBC SLS Unit of Measure/Package Level Indicator field uniquely identifies different package levels while maintaining a consistent product or catalog code.

== Unique Device Identification (UDI) Issuing Agency ==
HIBCC is recognized internationally by various regulatory bodies as a UDI Issuing Agency/Entity, an organization accredited to operate a system for the assignment of Unique Device Identifiers (UDIs). The HIBC SLS, in combination with HIBCC-assigned LICs, are used to create globally compliant UDIs.

The International Medical Device Regulators Forum (IMDRF) UDI Guidance named HIBCC as one of the three international organizations operating a universally accepted ISO/IEC coding standard that would facilitate a globally harmonized approach to UDI.

HIBCC is designated as an accredited issuing agency for UDI by the U.S. Food and Drug Administration (FDA) under its UDI Rule, and by the European Commission (EC) under both the Medical Device Regulation (MDR 2017/745) and the In Vitro Diagnostic Regulation (IVDR 2017/746). HIBCC has subsequently been named as a UDI issuing agency for medical device regulations in the following countries: Australia, Brazil, Colombia, India, Saudi Arabia, Singapore, South Korea, Switzerland, Taiwan, and Turkey, as well as for developing regulations in Canada and the United Kingdom.

== Health Industry Number (HIN) ==
HIBCC developed the HIN as a universal location identifier for use in electronic communications and transactions by all trading partners in the healthcare supply chain. The HIN System has since been widely adopted by pharmaceutical and medical device manufacturers, distributors, Group Purchasing Organizations (GPO), providers, and other industry stakeholders.

The HIN is intended to be a “bridge” between a company’s internal account numbers and the account numbers of its trading partners. Instead of sending an internal account number for an end-customer in a business transaction, or sending textual data such as name and address, HINs provide an unambiguous means of identifying the common customers of trading partners without the hindrance of maintaining multiple cross-references.
