= Scan (company) =

Software company based in Provo, Utah, United States

Scan, Inc
- Type: Subsidiary
- Founded: 2011; 15 years ago
- Headquarters: Provo, Utah, USA
- Parent: Snap Inc. (2014–present)

Scan is a mobile app development company headquartered in Provo, Utah, United States. The company was founded in January 2011 by Garrett Gee together with his college friends Ben Turley and Kirk Ouimet. The company, owned and operated by Scan, Inc, was acquired by Snapchat in 2014 for $54 million.

== Overview ==
Scan builds products and services related to 'scannable' items such as QR codes. Scan's products consist of mobile applications that consumers use for reading a variety of physical codes such as QR codes, NFC, and machine-recognizable images (Computer Vision). Scan's website allows for the creation of QR codes as well as targeted codes that link to web destinations such as social network profiles, websites, and Scan-hosted personal pages. As of June 2013, Scan had raised $1.7M in seed investment from Google Ventures, The Social+Capital Partnership, Ludlow Ventures, Naval Ravikant, Troy Carter, Shervin Pishevar, Charles River Ventures, and Vikas Gupta.

The company launched its iOS application in February 2011 and had received over 1 million installs three months later. After a year and a half, the application had been downloaded 10 million times. As of December 2012, Scan reported 25 million downloads on the iOS and Android platforms. In 2014 Scan was purchased by Snapchat for $54 million and the Scan app developed into Snapcode.

== History ==
Garrett Gee, while attending Brigham Young University, developed the app alongside fellow students Kirk Ouimet and Ben Turley. The first iOS application was launched in a student competition at BYU in 2012.

In 2013, Garrett appeared on the show Shark Tank to pitch the app as a possible investment. The sharks of the show decided not to invest in his app.

In March 2012, Scan had 9 employees.

=== Revenue ===
Scan's reported revenue model relies on advertising revenue from scanned "1D" barcodes that lead users to affiliate links and advertising. In May 2012, Gee claimed that the affiliate and advertising revenue had topped $1,000 per day.

=== Features/Releases ===
In early 2012, Scan had released support for scanning QR codes, 1D barcodes, and offered connections to these technologies in the form of websites, shopping carts, social media actions, and lead generation pages. In February, Scan launched Scan Pages; mobile optimized, hosted sites for businesses and individuals that are linked to QR codes. In May 2012, Scan launched a "Scan-to-gram" which allowed users to create QR codes that linked to their Instagram profiles. In December 2012, Scan launched version 2.0 of its apps, which also supported scanning of QR, UPC, EAN, and ISBN codes.

The Scan website was overhauled in August 2013, making it easier to create QR codes and related materials.

=== Snapchat Purchase ===
A Sony executive who was on the board of Snapchat as well as emails stolen during the Sony Pictures hack leaked the information that Snapchat had paid $50 million to acquire Scan. Snapchat's Snapcode feature is powered by Scan's technology. Later reports gave a value of $54 million, with $30 million in cash and the rest in equity in Snapchat.
