= DataGlyph =

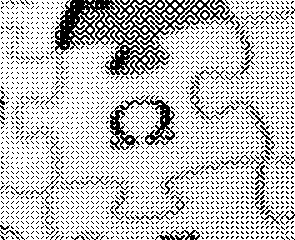
Part of the Wikipedia logo as a DataGlyph code

DataGlyph is a 2D matrix barcode system developed at Xerox PARC. DataGlyph is designed to unobtrusively integrate computer-readable information into printed materials.

The binary data represented by a DataGlyph is encoded with Reed–Solomon error correction. The data is interlaced and printed as a grid of 45° diagonal lines, with a downward slope representing 0, and an upward slope representing 1. These glyphs are printed very densely to the extent that they can appear as continuous, solid colors, akin to halftone. In this way, DataGlyphs can be hidden, tuned to appear similar to a particular image, printed in the background of text, or presented as a decorative page border.

DataGlyphs have been incorporated into digital cards, with a data density of reportedly 3 kilobytes, much higher than magnetic stripes.
