= Association for Automatic Identification and Mobility =

American trade organisation

- Abbreviation: AIM
- Formation: 1973
- Headquarters: Cranberry Township, Butler County, Pennsylvania
- Website: www.aimglobal.org

Association for Automatic Identification and Mobility (AIM) is an industry trade group that developed and standardized bar codes, automatic identification and data capture. It is based in Cranberry Township, Butler County, Pennsylvania.

When AIM was formed in 1973, it consisted of four member organizations. In the years since, it was grown to over 400 members worldwide, including Intel and the Food and Drug Administration (FDA).
