= JAB Code =

2D matrix symbology

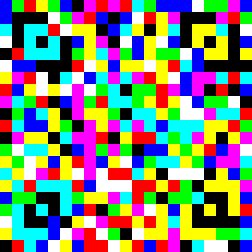
Wikipedia greetings with link encoded using eight-colour JAB Code

JAB Code (Just Another Barcode) is a colour 2D matrix symbology made of colour squares arranged in either square or rectangle grids. It was developed by Fraunhofer Institute for Secure Information Technology SIT.

The code contains one primary symbol and optionally multiple secondary symbols. The primary symbol contains four finder patterns located at the corners of the symbol.

The code currently uses either four or eight colours, although the specification allows for up to 256 colors. The four basic colours (cyan, magenta, yellow, and black) are the four primary colours of the subtractive CMYK colour model, which is the most widely used system in the industry for colour printing on a white base such as paper. The other four colours (blue, red, green, and white) are secondary colours of the CMYK model and each originates as an equal mixture of a pair of basic colours.

The barcode is not subject to licensing and was submitted to ISO/IEC standardization as ISO/IEC 23634 expected to be approved at the beginning of 2021 and finalized in 2022. The software is open source and published under the LGPL v2.1 license. The specification is freely available.

Because the colour adds a third dimension to the two-dimensional matrix, a JAB Code can contain more information in the same area than two-colour (black and white) codes; a four-colour code doubles the amount of data that can be stored, and an eight-colour code triples it. This increases the chances the barcode can store an entire message, rather than just partial data with a reference to a full message somewhere else (such as a link to a website), which would eliminate the need for additional always-available infrastructure beyond the printed barcode itself. It may be used to digitally sign encrypted digital versions of printed legal documents, contracts, certificates (e.g., diplomas, training), and medical prescriptions or to provide product authenticity assurance, increasing protection against counterfeits.
