= Automatic identification and data capture =

Methods of automatically identifying objects by computer system

Automatic identification and data capture (AIDC) refers to the methods of automatically identifying objects, collecting data about them, and entering them directly into computer systems, without human involvement. Technologies typically considered as part of AIDC include QR codes, barcodes, radio-frequency identification (RFID), biometrics (like iris and facial recognition system), magnetic stripes, optical character recognition (OCR), smart cards, and voice recognition. AIDC is also commonly referred to as "Automatic Identification", "Auto-ID" and "Automatic Data Capture".

AIDC is the process or means of obtaining external data, particularly through the analysis of images, sounds, or videos. To capture data, a transducer is employed which converts the actual image or a sound into a digital file. The file is then stored and at a later time, it can be analyzed by a computer, or compared with other files in a database to verify identity or to provide authorization to enter a secured system. Capturing data can be done in various ways; the best method depends on application.

In biometric security systems, capture is the acquisition of or the process of acquiring and identifying characteristics such as finger image, palm image, facial image, iris print, or voiceprint which involves audio data, and the rest all involve video data.

Radio-frequency identification is relatively a new AIDC technology, which was first developed in the 1980s. The technology acts as a base in automated data collection, identification, and analysis systems worldwide. RFID has found its importance in a wide range of markets, including livestock identification and Automated Vehicle Identification (AVI) systems because of its capability to track moving objects. These automated wireless AIDC systems are effective in manufacturing environments where barcode labels could not survive.

== Overview of automatic identification methods ==
Nearly all the automatic identification technologies consist of three principal components, which also comprise the sequential steps in AIDC:

1. Data encoder. A code is a set of symbols or signals that usually represent alphanumeric characters. When data are encoded, the characters are translated into machine-readable code. A label or tag containing the encoded data is attached to the item that is to be identified.
2. Machine reader or scanner. This device reads the encoded data, converting them to an alternative form, typically an electrical analog signal.
3. Data decoder. This component transforms the electrical signal into digital data and finally back into the original alphanumeric characters.

== Capturing data from printed documents ==
One of the most common applications of data capture is extracting information from paper documents and saving it into databases (CMS, ECM, etc.). Basic technologies used for data capture vary by data type:

- Optical character recognition (OCR) – for printed text recognition
- Intelligent character recognition (ICR) – for hand-printed text recognition
- Optical mark recognition (OMR) – for marks recognition
- Barcode recognition (BCR/OBR)
- Document layer recognition (DLR)

These technologies enable data extraction from paper documents for processing in enterprise systems like enterprise resource planning (ERP) and customer relationship management (CRM).

The documents for data capture can be divided into 3 groups: structured, semi-structured, and unstructured.

Structured documents (e.g., questionnaires, tests, tax returns, insurance forms, ballots) have identical layouts, making data capture straightforward since fields are always in the same location.

Semi-structured documents (e.g., invoices, purchase orders, waybills) follow a general format, but layout varies by vendor or parameters. Capturing data requires more advanced methods.

Unstructured documents (letters, contracts, articles, etc.) could be flexible with structure and appearance.

== The Internet and the future ==
Advocates for the growth of AIDC systems argue that AIDC has the potential to greatly increase industrial efficiency and general quality of life. If widely implemented, the technology could reduce or eliminate counterfeiting, theft, and product waste, while improving the efficiency of supply chains. However, others have voiced criticisms of the potential expansion of AIDC systems into everyday life, citing concerns over personal privacy, consent, and security.

The global Auto-ID Labs association, founded in 1999, includes major corporations such as Walmart, Coca-Cola, Gillette, Johnson & Johnson, Pfizer, Procter & Gamble, Unilever, UPS, and tech firms like SAP, Alien, and Sun, along with five academic research centers. These centers are based at the Massachusetts Institute of Technology (USA), University of Cambridge (UK), University of Adelaide (Australia), Keio University (Japan), ETH Zurich and University of St. Gallen (Switzerland).

Auto-ID Labs envisions a future supply chain based on the Internet of Objects — a global application of RFID. Their goal is to harmonize technology, processes, and organization. Research focuses on miniaturization (targeting 0.3 mm per chip), cost reduction (around $0.05 per unit), and innovative applications such as contactless payments (Sony/Philips), domotics (e.g., tagged clothing and intelligent appliances), and sporting events (e.g., timing at the Berlin Marathon).

== AIDC 100 ==
AIDC 100 is a professional organization for the automatic identification and data capture (AIDC) industry. This group is composed of individuals who made substantial contributions to the advancement of the industry. Increasing business's understanding of AIDC processes and technologies are the primary goals of the organization.

== See also ==
- Automated species identification
- Automatic equipment identification
- Automatic number-plate recognition
- Data privacy
- Device management
- Digital Mailroom
- Face recognition
- Field Service Management
- Mobile Enterprise
- Mobile asset management
- Smart data capture
- Ubiquitous computing
- Ubiquitous Commerce
