= TAL Technologies =

American software development company

TAL Technologies, Inc.
- Company type: Privately owned
- Industry: Software, IT
- Founded: 1985
- Headquarters: Philadelphia, PA, United States
- Key people: President: Thomas Lutz; CEO: Susan Rogers
- Products: RS-232 and TCP/IP Data Collection Software, Barcode Software
- Website: www.taltech.com

TAL Technologies, Inc. is a privately owned software development company which develops and sells applications that automate data collection. Their main product lines include WinWedge, TCP-Com, TAL Barcode ActiveX Control and B-Coder Professional Barcode software.

== Corporate history ==
- 1985: TAL Technologies, Inc. was founded by President, Thomas Lutz
- 1989: Released Software Wedge for DOS, a RS-232 data collection software
- 1990: Released WinWedge, a Windows-based RS-232 data collection software
- 1990: Released B-Coder, a Barcode image generating software
- 2001: Introduced CE-Wedge, an RS-232 data collection software for Pocket PCs
- 2002: Introduced TCP-Com, an RS-232 to TCP/IP converter software

== Key Products ==
TAL Technologies, Inc. major product lines include:

- WinWedge - RS-232 data collection products for quality control and laboratory instruments including balances, scales, pH meters, spectrophotometers, force gauges, digital electronic measuring instruments, etc.
- TCP/Com - Multifunction serial to ethernet (and ethernet to serial) interface software. Easily access a serial device via a TCP/IP or UDP network or redirect Ethernet/IP data to real or “Virtual” RS-232 serial ports.
- B-Coder - Software for generating customized barcode images of various symbologies such as Code 39, UPC, PDF417, Data Matrix, etc.
- Barcode ActiveX Control - ActiveX Control used for generating barcode images
