= Handheld (disambiguation) =

A handheld is a mobile device, a computer small enough to hold and operate in one's hand.

Handheld, hand-held, or hand held may also refer to:

== Technology ==
- Hand-held camera
  - Handheld Universal Lunar Camera
- Handheld game console
- Handheld television

== Companies ==
- Hand Held Products, a defunct computer hardware company

== Other ==
- Hand Held (film), a 2010 documentary film
