= Data matrix =

Data matrix may refer to:

- Matrix (mathematics), rectangular array of elements
- Data Matrix, a two-dimensional barcode
- Data matrix (multivariate statistics), mathematical matrix of data whose rows represent different repetition of an experiment, and whose columns represent different kinds of datum taken for each repetition
- Data set, collection of data in tabular form
