= Data Matrix =

Two-dimensional matrix barcode

An example of a Data Matrix code, encoding the text: "Wikipedia, the free encyclopedia"

A Data Matrix is a two-dimensional code consisting of black and white "cells" or dots arranged in either a square or rectangular pattern, also known as a matrix. The information to be encoded can be text or numeric data. The usual data size is from a few bytes up to 1556 bytes. The length of the encoded data depends on the number of cells in the matrix. Error correction codes are often used to increase reliability: even if one or more cells are damaged so it is unreadable, the message can still be read. A Data Matrix symbol can store up to 2,335 alphanumeric characters.

Data Matrix symbols are rectangular, usually square in shape and composed of square "cells" which represent bits. Depending on the coding used, a "light" cell represents a 0 and a "dark" cell is a 1, or vice versa. Every Data Matrix is composed of two solid adjacent borders in an "L" shape (called the "finder pattern") and two other borders consisting of alternating dark and light "cells" or modules (called the "timing pattern"). Within these borders are rows and columns of cells encoding information. The finder pattern is used to locate and orient the symbol while the timing pattern provides a count of the number of rows and columns in the symbol. As more data is encoded in the symbol, the number of cells (rows and columns) increases. Each code is unique. Symbol sizes vary from 10×10 to 144×144 in the new version ECC 200, and from 9×9 to 49×49 in the old version ECC 000 – 140.0

== Applications ==
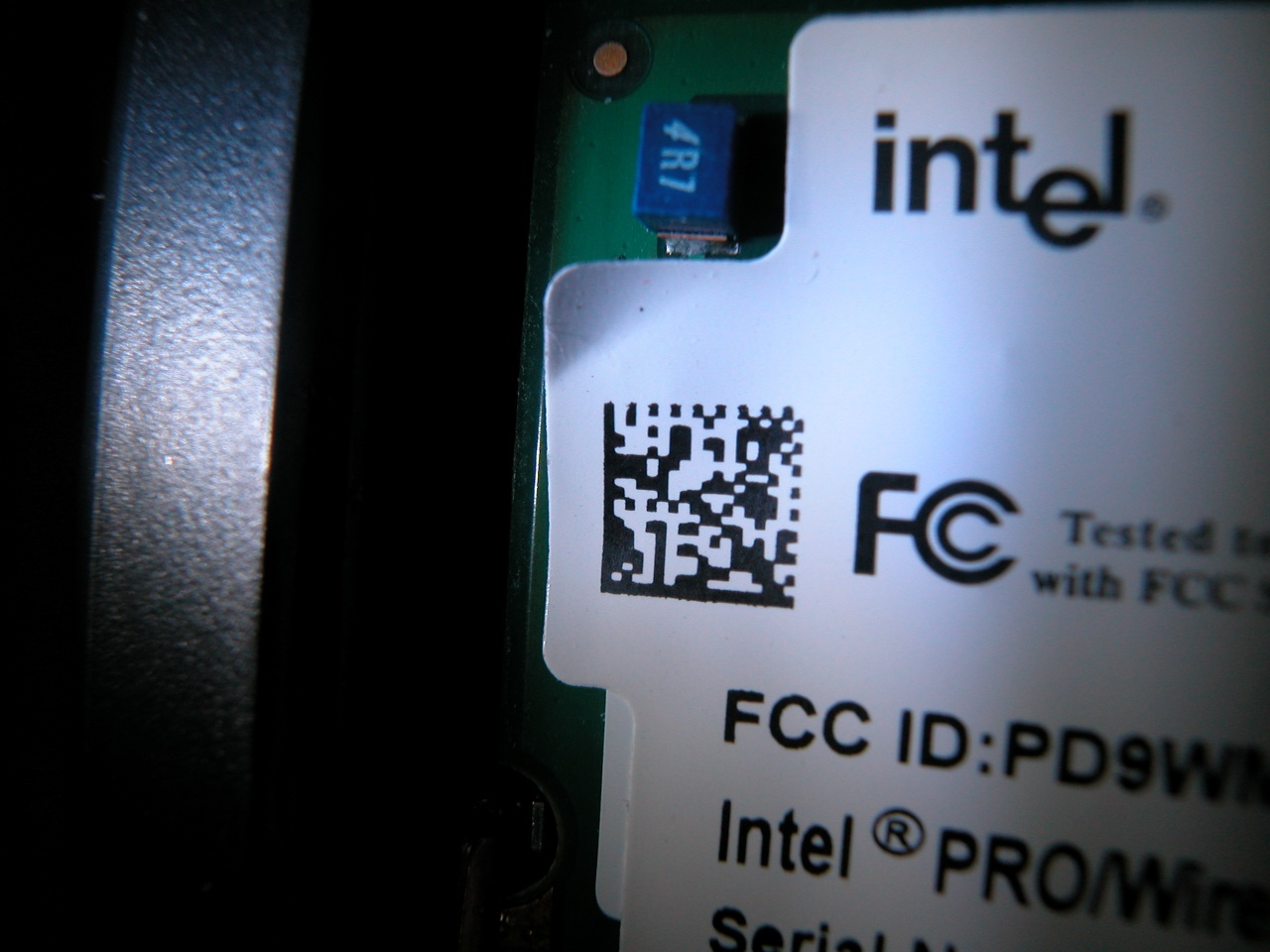
A Data Matrix on a Mini PCI card, encoding the serial number 15C06E115AZC72983004

The most popular application for Data Matrix is marking small items, due to the code's ability to encode fifty characters in a symbol that is readable at 2 or 3 mm^{2} (0.003 or 0.005 sq in) and the fact that the code can be read with only a 20% contrast ratio. A Data Matrix is scalable; commercial applications exist with images as small as 300 micrometres (0.012 in) (laser etched on a 600-micrometre (0.024 in) silicon device) and as large as a 1-metre (3 ft) square (painted on the roof of a boxcar). Fidelity of the marking and reading systems are the only limitation. The US Electronic Industries Alliance (EIA) recommends using Data Matrix for labeling small electronic components.

Data Matrix codes are becoming common on printed media such as labels and letters. The code can be read quickly by a barcode reader which allows the media to be tracked, for example when a parcel has been dispatched to the recipient.

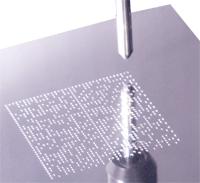
Marking surfaces

For industrial engineering purposes, Data Matrix codes can be marked directly onto components, ensuring that only the intended component is identified with the data-matrix-encoded data. The codes can be marked onto components with various methods, but within the aerospace industry these are commonly industrial ink-jet, dot-peen marking, laser marking, and electrolytic chemical etching (ECE). These methods give a permanent mark which can last up to the lifetime of the component.

Once marked onto the component, reader cameras along the production line, as well as a camera used by technicians after production is complete, can decode the Data Matrix to read relevant information. This can include the date of manufacture, serial number, and any other relevant information the manufacturer chooses to include. These reader cameras can also be used to track the movement of the component through the production line, as well as performing inventory stock checks.

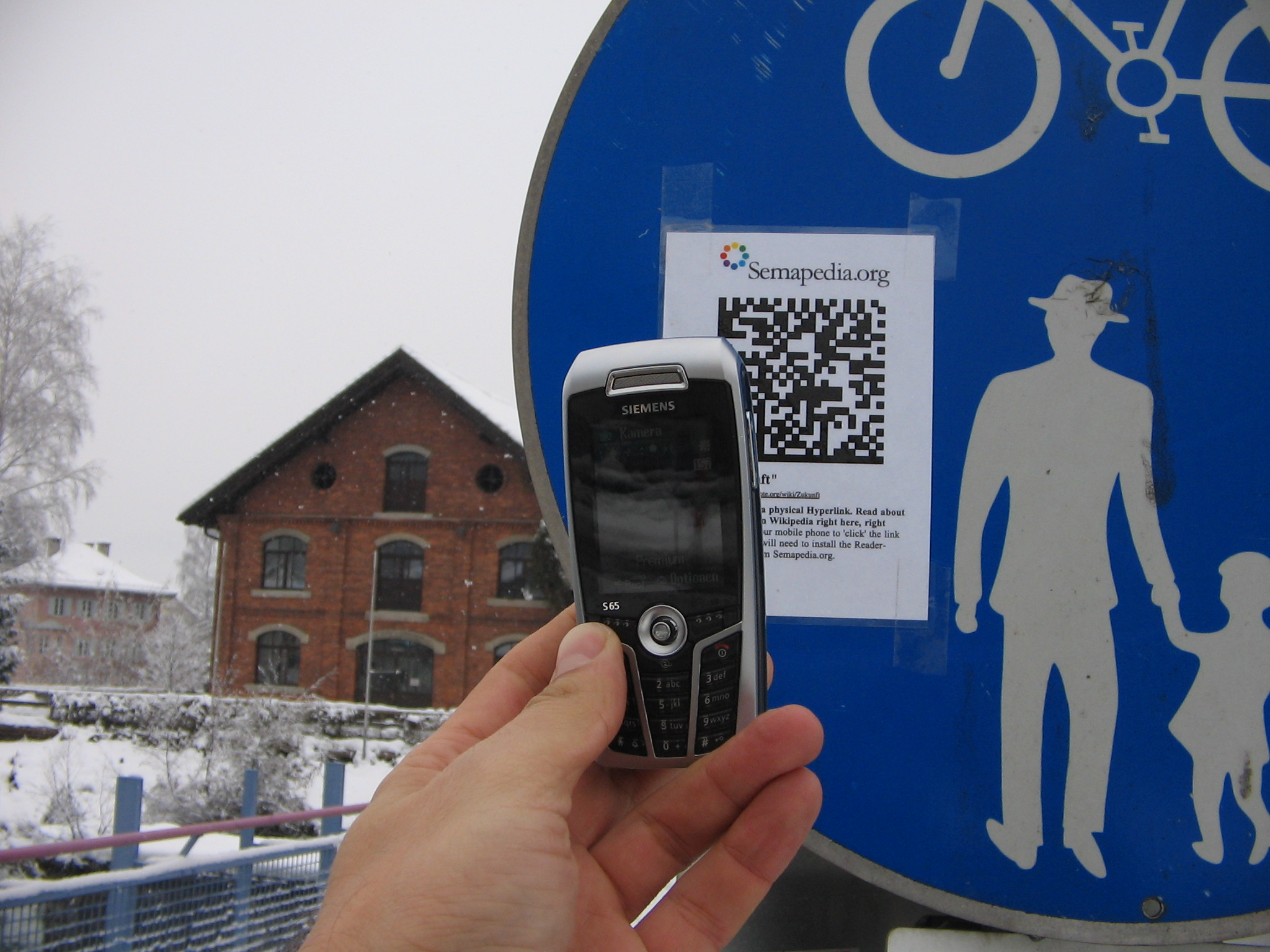
Reading Data Matrix code with mobile phone (Wikipedia's former Semacode project)

Data Matrix codes, along with other open-source codes such as 1D barcodes can also be read with mobile phones by downloading code specific mobile applications. Although many mobile devices are able to read 2D codes including Data Matrix Code, few extend the decoding to enable mobile access and interaction, whereupon the codes can be used securely and across media; for example, in track and trace, anti-counterfeit, e.govt, and banking solutions.

=== Food industry ===
Data Matrix codes are used in the food industry in autocoding systems to prevent food products being packaged and dated incorrectly. Codes are maintained internally on a food manufacturers database and associated with each unique product, e.g. ingredient variations. For each product run the unique code is supplied to the printer. Label artwork is required to allow the 2D Data Matrix to be positioned for optimal scanning. For black on white codes testing isn't required unless print quality is an issue, but all color variations need to be tested before production to ensure they are readable.

=== Art ===
In May 2006 a German computer programmer, Bernd Hopfengärtner, created a large Data Matrix in a wheat field (in a fashion similar to crop circles). The message read "Hello, World!".

== Technical specifications ==
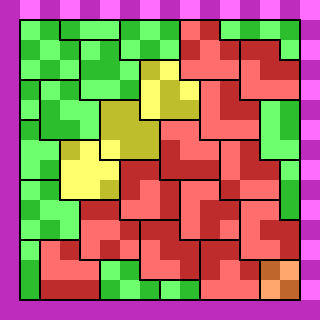
An example of a Data Matrix code, encoding the text: "Wikipedia" coloured to show data (green), padding (yellow), error correction (red), finder and timing (magenta) and unused (orange).

Data Matrix symbols are made up of modules arranged within a perimeter finder and timing pattern. It can encode up to 3,116 bytes, by default interpreted as characters from an ASCII character set. The symbol consists of data regions which contain modules set out in a regular array. Large symbols contain several regions. Each data region is delimited by a finder pattern, and this is surrounded on all four sides by a quiet zone border (margin). (Note: The modules may be round or square- no specific shape is defined in the standard. For example, dot-peened cells are generally round.)

Data Matrix has an error rate of less than 1 in 10 million characters scanned.

Data Matrix is designed to be readable in inverted color.

=== Data Matrix ECC 000–140 ===
Older versions of Data Matrix include ECC 000, ECC 050, ECC 080, ECC 100, ECC 140. Instead of using Reed–Solomon codes like ECC 200, ECC 000–140 use a convolution-based error correction. Each varies in the amount of error correction it offers, with ECC 000 offering none, and ECC 140 offering the greatest. For error detection at decode time, even in the case of ECC 000, each of these versions also encode a cyclic redundancy check (CRC) on the bit pattern. As an added measure, the placement of each bit in the code is determined by bit-placement tables included in the specification. These older versions always have an odd number of modules, and can be made in sizes ranging from 9 × 9 to 49 × 49. All symbols utilizing the ECC 000 through 140 error correction can be recognized by the upper-right corner module being the inverse of the background color. (binary 1).

According to ISO/IEC 16022, "ECC 000–140 should only be used in closed applications where a single party controls both the production and reading of the symbols and is responsible for overall system performance."

=== Data Matrix ECC 200 ===
ECC 200, the newer version of Data Matrix, uses Reed–Solomon codes for error and erasure recovery. ECC 200 allows the routine reconstruction of the entire encoded data string when the symbol has sustained 30% damage, assuming the matrix can still be accurately located.

Symbols have an even number of rows and an even number of columns. Most of the symbols are square with sizes from 10 × 10 to 144 × 144. Some symbols however are rectangular with sizes from 8×18 to 16×48 (even values only). All symbols using the ECC 200 error correction can be recognized by the upper-right corner module being the same as the background color. (binary 0).

Additional capabilities that differentiate ECC 200 symbols from the earlier standards include:

- Specification of the character set (via Extended Channel Interpretations)
- Rectangular symbols
- Structured append (linking of up to 16 symbols to encode larger amounts of data)

==== Error correction ====
ECC 200 codes use Reed–Solomon error correction over the finite field $\mathbb{F}_{256}$ (or GF(2^{8})), the elements of which are encoded as bytes of 8 bits; the byte $b_7b_6b_5b_4b_3b_2b_1b_0$ with a standard numerical value $\textstyle\sum_{i=0}^7 b_i 2^i$ encodes the field element $\textstyle\sum_{i=0}^7 b_i \alpha^i$ where $\alpha \in \mathbb{F}_{256}$ is taken to be a primitive element satisfying $\alpha^8 + \alpha^5 + \alpha^3 + \alpha^2 + 1 = 0$. The primitive polynomial is $x^8 + x^5 + x^3 + x^2 + 1$, corresponding to the polynomial number 301, with initial root = 1 to obtain generator polynomials. The Reed–Solomon code uses different generator polynomials over $\mathbb{F}_{256}$, depending on how many error correction bytes the code adds. The number of bytes added is equal to the degree of the generator polynomial.

For example, in the 10 × 10 symbol, there are 3 data bytes and 5 error correction bytes. The generator polynomial is obtained as: $g(x)=(x+\alpha)(x+\alpha^2)(x+\alpha^3)(x+\alpha^4)(x+\alpha^5)$,

which gives: $g(x)=x^5+\alpha^{235}x^4+\alpha^{207}x^3+\alpha^{210}x^2+\alpha^{244}x+\alpha^{15}$,

or with decimal coefficients: $g(x)=x^5 +62x^4 + 111x^3 +15x^2 + 48x + 228$.

==== Byte encoding ====
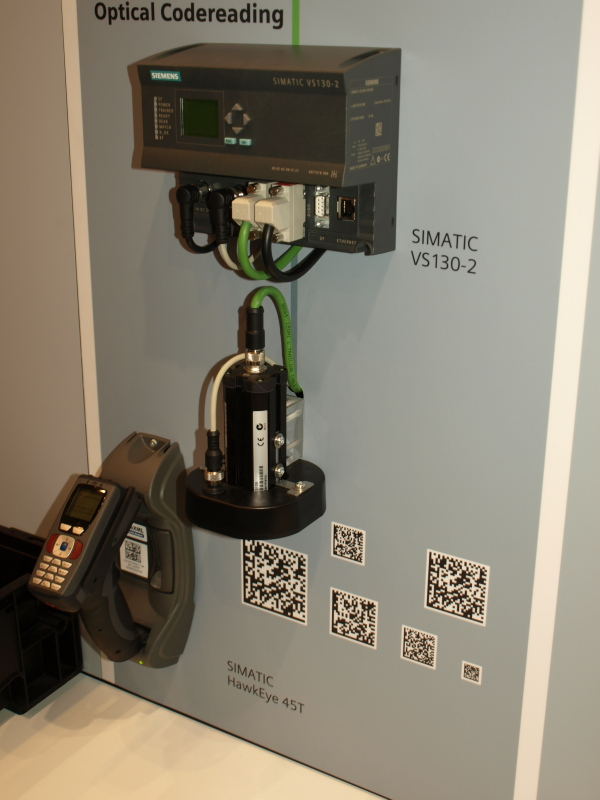
Industrial Data Matrix code readers

The encoding process is described in the ISO/IEC standard 16022:2006. Open-source software for encoding and decoding the ECC-200 variant of Data Matrix has been published.

The diagrams below illustrate the placement of the message data within a Data Matrix symbol. The message is "Wikipedia", and it is arranged in a somewhat complicated diagonal pattern starting near the upper-left corner. Some characters are split in two pieces, such as the initial W, and the third 'i' is in "corner pattern 2" rather than the usual L-shaped arrangement. Also shown are the end-of-message code (marked End), the padding (P) and error correction (E) bytes, and four modules of unused space (X).

The symbol is of size 16×16 (14×14 data area), with 12 data bytes (including 'End' and padding) and 12 error correction bytes. A (255,243,6) Reed Solomon code shortened to (24,12,6) is used. It can correct up to 6 byte errors or erasures.

To obtain the error correction bytes, the following procedure may be carried out:

The generator polynomial specified for the (24,12,6) code, is: $g(x)=x^{12} + 242x^{11} + 100x^{10} + 178x^9 + 97x^8 + 213x^7 + 142x^6 + 42x^5 + 61x^4 + 91x^3 + 158x^2 +153x + 41$, which may also be written in the form of a matrix of decimal coefficients:

[1 242 100 178 97 213 142 42 61 91 158 153 41]

The 12-byte long message "Wikipedia" including 'End', P1 and P2, in decimal coefficients (see the diagrams below for the computation method using ASCII values), is:

[88 106 108 106 113 102 101 106 98 129 251 147]

Using the procedure for Reed-Solomon systematic encoding, the 12 error correction bytes obtained (E1 through E12 in decimal) in the form of the remainder after polynomial division are:

[104 216 88 39 233 202 71 217 26 92 25 232]

These error correction bytes are then appended to the original message. The resulting coded message has 24 bytes, and is in the form:

[W i k i p e d i a 'End' P1 P2 E1 E2 E3 E4 E5 E6 E7 E8 E9 E10 E11 E12]

or in decimal coefficients:

[88 106 108 106 113 102 101 106 98 129 251 147 104 216 88 39 233 202 71 217 26 92 25 232]

and in hexadecimal coefficients:

[58 6A 6C 6A 71 66 65 6A 62 81 FB 93 68 D8 58 27 E9 CA 47 D9 1A 5C 19 E8]

(Note the 58 6A 6C 6A 71 66 65 6A 62 is exactly off by one from the ASCII encoding of "Wikipedia" 57 69 6B 69 70 65 64 69 61. This is due to the data encoding, described in the next section.)

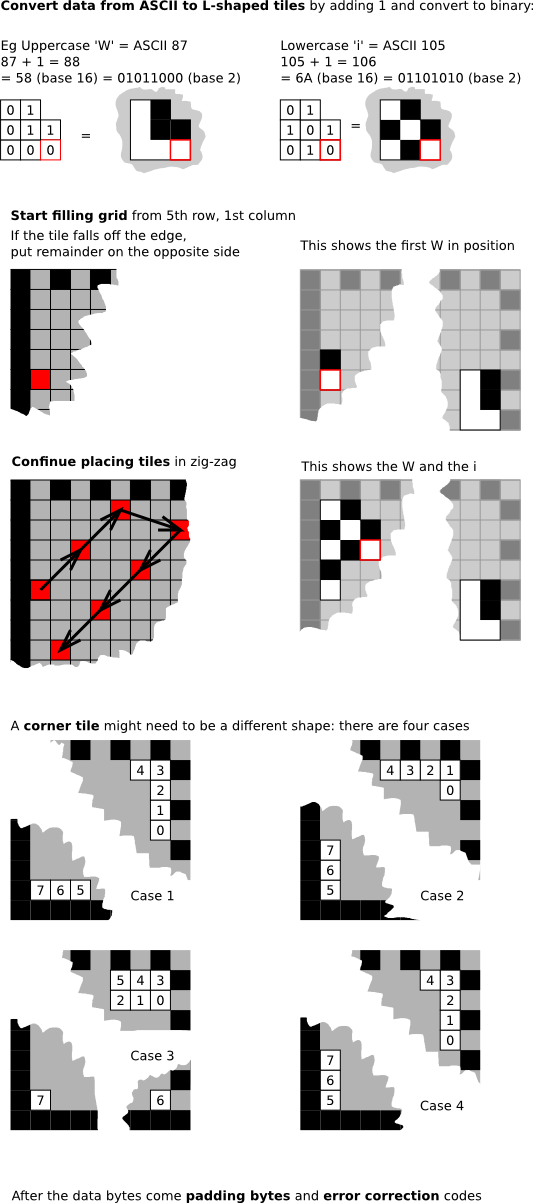

=== Data encoding ===
Data matrix operates in units of 8-bit codewords ("bytes"). The default mode stores one ASCII character per 8-bit codeword and allows for using control codes to switch to other modes. Other modes return to the default mode when they are done encoding the data.

Codeword	Codeword hexadecimal	Interpretation
0	0	Not used
1–128	1-80	ASCII data (ASCII value + 1)
129	81	Pad
130–229	82-e5	Digit pairs 00–99
230	e6	Begin C40 encoding
231	e7	Begin Base 256 encoding
232	e8	FNC1
233	e9	Structured append. Allows a message to be split across multiple symbols.
234	ea	Reader programming
235	eb	Set high bit of the following character
236	ec	05 Macro
237	ed	06 Macro
238	ee	Begin ANSI X12 EDI data encoding
239	ef	Begin Text encoding
240	f0	Begin EDIFACT encoding
241	f1	Extended Channel Interpretation code
242–253	f2-fd	Not used in ASCII encoding
254	fe	In C40, Text or ANSI X12 encoding, acts as an Unlatch returning to ASCII encoding
255	ff	Not used in ASCII encoding

By default, encoded values are interpreted as text in ASCII and ISO-8859-1. For example, to encode the string Wikipédia, one first converts to ISO-8859-1 57 69 6B 69 70 E9 64 69 61 20, then use a combination of ASCII and Base 256 encodings to arrive at 58 6A 6C 6A 71 01 ea 65 6A 62 (base-256 italicized). This is then fed to the byte-to-image encoding routine. The Extended Channel Interpretation code may be used to change the interpretation: for example, prepending f1 01 (ECI: \0) would cause the bytestring to instead be decoded as code page 437, where E9 is instead Θ.

==== Text modes ====
The C40, Text and X12 modes are potentially more compact for storing text messages. They are similar to DEC Radix-50, using character codes in the range 0–39, and three of these codes are combined to make a number up to 40^{3}=64000, which is packed into two bytes (maximum value 65536) as follows:

V = C1×1600 + C2×40 + C3 + 1
B1 = floor(V/256)
B2 = V mod 256

The resulting value of B1 is in the range 0–250. The special value 254 is used to return to ASCII encoding mode.

Character code interpretations are shown in the table below. The C40 and Text modes have four separate sets. Set 0 is the default, and contains codes that temporarily select a different set for the next character. The only difference is that they reverse upper-and lower-case letters. C40 is primarily upper-case, with lower-case letters in set 3; Text is the other way around. Set 1, containing ASCII control codes, and set 2, containing punctuation symbols are identical in C40 and Text mode.

Code	set 0		set 1	set 2	set 3		X12
Code	C40	Text	set 1	set 2	C40	Text	X12
0	set 1		NUL	!	`		CR
1	set 2		SOH	"	a	A	*
2	set 3		STX	#	b	B	>
3	space		ETX	$	c	C	space
4	0		EOT	%	d	D	0
5	1		ENQ	&	e	E	1
6	2		ACK	'	f	F	2
7	3		BEL	(	g	G	3
8	4		BS	)	h	H	4
9	5		HT	*	i	I	5
10	6		LF	+	j	J	6
11	7		VT	,	k	K	7
12	8		FF	–	l	L	8
13	9		CR	.	m	M	9
14	A	a	SO	/	n	N	A
15	B	b	SI	:	o	O	B
16	C	c	DLE	;	p	P	C
17	D	d	DC1	<	q	Q	D
18	E	e	DC2	=	r	R	E
19	F	f	DC3	>	s	S	F
20	G	g	DC4	?	t	T	G
21	H	h	NAK	@	u	U	H
22	I	i	SYN	[	v	V	I
23	J	j	ETB	\	w	W	J
24	K	k	CAN	]	x	X	K
25	L	l	EM	^	y	Y	L
26	M	m	SUB	_	z	Z	M
27	N	n	ESC	FNC1	{		N
28	O	o	FS		|		O
29	P	p	GS		}		P
30	Q	q	RS	hibit	~		Q
31	R	r	US		DEL		R
32	S	s					S
33	T	t					T
34	U	u					U
35	V	v					V
36	W	w					W
37	X	x					X
38	Y	y					Y
39	Z	z					Z

===== EDIFACT mode =====
EDIFACT mode uses six bits per character, with four characters packed into three bytes. It can store digits, upper-case letters, and many punctuation marks, but has no support for lower-case letters.

Code	Meaning
0–30	ASCII codes 64–94
31	Return to ASCII mode
32–63	ASCII codes 32–63

==== Base 256 mode ====
Base 256 mode data starts with a length indicator, followed by a number of data bytes. A length of 1 to 249 is encoded as a single byte, and longer lengths are stored as two bytes.

L1 = floor(length / 250) + 249, L2 = length mod 250

It is desirable to avoid long strings of zeros in the coded message, because they become large blank areas in the Data Matrix symbol, which may cause a scanner to lose synchronization. (The default ASCII encoding does not use zero for this reason.) In order to make that less likely, the length and data bytes are obscured by adding a pseudorandom value R(n), where n is the position in the byte stream.

R(n) = (149 × n) mod 255 + 1

== History ==
ISO/IEC 16022, the current international standard for Data Matrix, was first published as ISO/IEC 16022:2000 in 2000. As of April 2026, the latest revision is ISO/IEC 16022:2024 (Edition 3).

=== Standards ===
Data Matrix was invented by International Data Matrix, Inc. (ID Matrix) which was merged into RVSI/Acuity CiMatrix, who were acquired by Siemens AG in October 2005, Microscan Systems in September 2008, and Omron in 2017. Data Matrix is covered today by several ISO/IEC standards and is in the public domain for many applications, which means it can be used free of any licensing or royalties.

- ISO/IEC 16022:2024—Data Matrix bar code symbology specification
- ISO/IEC 15415—2-D Print quality standard
- ISO/IEC 15418:2016—Symbol data format semantics (GS1 application identifiers and ASC MH10 data identifiers and maintenance)
- ISO/IEC 15424:2008—Data Carrier Identifiers (including Symbology Identifiers) [IDs for distinguishing different barcode types]
- ISO/IEC 15434:2006—Syntax for high-capacity ADC media (format of data transferred from scanner to software, etc.)
- ISO/IEC 15459—Unique identifiers

== Patent issues ==
Prior to the expiration of US patent 5,612,524 in November 2007, intellectual property company Acacia Technologies claimed that Data Matrix was partially covered by its contents. As the patent owner, Acacia allegedly contacted Data Matrix users demanding license fees related to the patent.

Cognex Corporation, a large manufacturer of 2D barcode devices, filed a declaratory judgment complaint on 13 March 2006 after receiving information that Acacia had contacted its customers demanding licensing fees. On 19 May 2008 Judge Joan N. Ericksen of the U.S. District Court in Minnesota ruled in favor of Cognex. The ruling held that the '524 patent, which claimed to cover a system for capturing and reading 2D symbology codes, is both invalid and unenforceable due to inequitable conduct by the defendants during the procurement of the patent.

While the ruling was delivered after the patent expired, it precluded claims for infringement based on use of Data Matrix prior to November 2007.

A German patent application DE 4107020 was filed in 1991, and published in 1992. This patent is not cited in the above US patent applications and might invalidate them.

== See also ==
- PDF417
- Aztec Code
- High Capacity Color Barcode
- MaxiCode
- Nintendo e-Reader
- QR Code
- Semacode
- SPARQCode
- Trusted paper key
