= Hand Held Products =

US electronics manufacturer

Hand Held Products (previously HHP) was a US electronics manufacturer, established in 1981 in North Carolina. The company was a manufacturer of linear and 2D handheld barcode scanners based on imaging technology. Its product range included rugged mobile computers, image kiosks, and barcode verification devices. Its range of data collection and communication products were designed for mobile, on-site, and transaction processing applications. In 2007, the company was subsumed into the Honeywell Group.

== History ==
The Hand Held Products company, established in 1981 in Charlotte, North Carolina, began as a manufacturer of memory modules for Hewlett-Packard and Texas Instruments programmable calculators, and grew rapidly from 1983 thanks to an RFP hand-off by Hewett-Packard, as the package delivery company Federal Express selected their Micro-Wand portable data collection device to begin a proof of delivery system for package tracking.

In 1996, Hand Held Products launched a mobile computer with 2D imaging technology, the Dolphin 7200. In 1997, the Hand Held Product's Dolphin portable computer was selected by the United States Postal Service to be part of its proof of delivery system, although a third party provided the manufacturing. The deal was the industry's largest ever single order, at 300,000 units. In 2006–2007 United States Postal Service started replacing these portable computers with Motorola portable computers (370,000 units), which had bar code reading hardware (2D imager) and decoding and image processing software designed and supplied by Hand Held Products.

The company became HHP in late 1999, following a merger with Welch Allyn Data Collection, a subsidiary of Welch Allyn formed in 1972, which by the 1990s was manufacturing a complete line of handheld bar code readers. From then, the company had its company headquarters in New York.

Hand Held Products had a significant presence in Europe, with its EMEA headquarters and European repair center in Eindhoven, Netherlands. It also has offices in the UK, Germany and France and sales representation and resellers in most countries in Europe, the Middle East and Africa. Hand Held Products also has offices in Latin America and Asia.

On January 1, 2005, the company dropped HHP as its brand name and returned to its original name Hand Held Products.

On October 15, 2007, Hand Held Products announced it had agreed with Honeywell to be purchased for $390 million. On December 20, 2007 Honeywell’s acquisition of Hand Held was approved, and Hand Held became a new line of business within the Honeywell Security Group, initially called Honeywell Imaging and mobility. With Honeywell's acquisition of Metrologic in 2008 it renamed the business unit Honeywell Scanning and Mobility.
