= Department of Defense Activity Address Code =

Identifier

The Department of Defense Activity Address Code (DoDAAC) is a six position code that uniquely identifies a Department of Defense unit, activity, or organization that has the authority to requisition, contract for, receive, have custody of, issue, or ship DoD assets, or fund/pay bills for materials and/or services. The first positions of the code designate the particular Service/Agency element of ownership.

These codes are particularly important for U.S. Government financial, contracting, and auditing records. The codes are used across the entire federal government when ordering supplies from the supply system using MILSTRIP, FEDSTRIP, or DLMS procedures. When assigned for activities outside the Department of Defense, the codes are often referred to as AACs.

== See also ==
- Commercial and Government Entity - Issued by the U.S. DoD.
- Data Universal Numbering System - Issued by Dun & Bradstreet. Required for certain US government contractors and Federal grant recipients.
- Employer Identification Number - Issued by US IRS. Identifies organizations and employers.
- Trading Partner Identification Number
