= Ceres Community Project =

- Ceres Community Project logo
- Named after: Ceres, the Roman goddess of agriculture and motherly relationships
- Formation: 2007 (19 years ago)
- Founders: Cathryn Couch; JoEllen DeNicola
- Type: Charitable organization
- Legal status: 501(c) (tax-exempt nonprofit U.S. organization in U.S.)
- Location: Sebastopol, CA, US
- Coordinates: 38.4008668°N 122.8971144°W
- Website: www.ceresproject.org
- Remarks: EIN 26-2250997

The Ceres Community Project is a U.S. non-profit organization that mentors teens in nutrient-dense food preparation as well as chef, employment, and business skills, then works with volunteers to deliver the food to people with life-threatening illnesses and their families. Ceres also includes a garden to grow produce for the program. The organization has also partnered with other non-profit organizations such as the Work Horse Organic Agriculture (WHOA), which supplies organic produce and eggs to Ceres.

The program has had significant impacts on both the teen chefs and the clients, with increases of fruit and vegetables and decreases in unhealthy food consumption in both groups. Ceres has also served as a model for similar projects in other communities such as in Chicago and Cleveland.

== History ==
Cathryn Couch, a former professional chef, founded Ceres after taking a friend's daughter as an apprentice to cook for a friend who had stage 2 breast cancer.

== Bibliography ==
- Couch, Cathryn; DeNicola, JoEllen (2011) [2009]. Nourshing Connections Cookbook: The Healing Power of Food & Community (2nd ed.). Sebastopol, CA, US: Ceres Community Project. ISBN 9780615465487. OCLC 743804722.
