= Data Universal Numbering System =

Unique company identifier developed by Dun & Bradstreet

The Data Universal Numbering System, abbreviated as DUNS or D-U-N-S, is a proprietary system developed and managed by Dun & Bradstreet (D&B) that assigns a unique numeric identifier, referred to as a "DUNS number" to a single business entity. It was introduced in 1963 to support D&B's credit reporting practice. It is standard worldwide. DUNS users include the European Commission, the United Nations, Google, and Apple. More than 50 global industry and trade associations recognize, recommend, or require DUNS. The DUNS database contains over 300 million entries for businesses throughout the world. DUNS numbers can be represented using ISO/IEC 6523 using ICD 0060.

== Details ==
The DUNS number is a nine-digit number, issued by D&B, assigned to each business location in the D&B database, having a unique, separate, and distinct operation for the purpose of identifying them. The DUNS number is random, and the digits have no apparent significance. Until approximately December 2006, the DUNS number contained a mod-10 check digit to support error detection. Discontinuing the check digit increased the inventory of available DUNS numbers by 800 million. As of 25 February 2017, the website shows that there is no charge to get a DUNS number, and the time to create the number is 24 to 48 hours. When obtaining a DUNS number online, the wait is usually 30 business days, but the assignment of a number can be immediate for UK businesses that provide their company registration number. When purchasing the "Small Business Starter" from Dun & Bradstreet Credibility Corp, the wait time reduces to 5 business days or less.

Unlike national employer identification numbers, a DUNS number may be issued to any business worldwide. Prior to 2022, certain U.S. government agencies required that a vendor have a DUNS number and a U.S. Employer Identification Number (EIN). Other agencies, such as some United Nations offices and Australian government agencies, require certain businesses to have a DUNS number.

A DUNS number is sometimes formatted with embedded dashes to promote readability, such as "15-048-3782". Modern usage typically omits dashes and shows the number as in the form "150483782". The dashes are not part of D&B's official definition of the DUNS number.

Businesses may choose to append four extra alphanumeric characters to their DUNS number. This is called a DUNS+4 number. The suffix is for the use of the business (for example, to identify different electronic funds transfer accounts). It has no significance otherwise and is not tracked by Dun & Bradstreet.

From October 2003 to April 2022 the United States government required that all organizations doing business with the federal government use a DUNS number as an identifier. After April 4, 2022, the federal government instead began using the Unique Entity Identifier created in SAM.gov.

Prior to DUNS numbers, the U.S. government used another coding system known as ACASS. The ACASS number was abolished on 5 October 2005, when a modernized platform replaced the ACASS system.

== See also ==
- Australian Business Number
- Authoritative Legal Entity Identifier (ALEI)
- CNPJ Brazilian National Registry of Legal Entities
- Commercial and Government Entity code (CAGE Code), issued by the Defense Logistics Information Service to identify suppliers to the Department of Defense
- International Business Registration Number (IBRN)
- Legal Entity Identifier an identification scheme identifies distinct legal entities that engage in financial transactions
- Paydex score, used to determine the creditworthiness of a corporation, similar to the FICO score used for individuals
- System for Award Management
- Trading Partner Identification Number (TPIN), issued by the Central Contractor Registration of the U.S. Government
- Unique Entity Identifier
