= European Unique Identifier =

ID number for European companies

The European Unique Identifier (EUID) is a standardized identification number for companies operating in the European Economic Area. The EUID is issued by the national business registers based on information provided during company registration.

The European Parliament adopted Directive 2012/17/EU on 13 June 2012 with the aim of setting up a system for connecting national business registers with each other.

The EUID is part of the Business Registers Interconnection System (BRIS), set up in line with Directive 2012/17/EU and Commission Implementing Regulation (EU) 2015/884.

== Structure ==
The structure of the EUID is compliant with ISO 6523. It contains a country code (ISO 3166-1 alpha-2, except for Greece, which uses EL), register identifier, registration number and optionally a verification digit.

== See also ==
- VAT identification number
- EORI number
