= MIL-STD-130 =

US military property marking specification

MIL-STD-130, "Identification Marking of U.S. Military Property," is a specification that describes markings required on items sold to the Department of Defense (DoD), including the addition, in about 2005, of UII (unique item identifier) Data Matrix machine-readable information (MRI) requirements. MIL-STD-130 describes the materials allowed, minimum text size and fonts, format, syntax and rules for identifying marks on a part, where to locate this marking plus exceptions and unique situations, such as vehicle identification numbers, cell phone IDs, etc. Other non-identifying markings—such as "this end up"—are covered under MIL-STD-129.

The purpose of the Department of Defense UII Registry is to have a single location where everything owned by the department is logged with purchase date, purchase price and dates when it is sent for repairs/refurbishment or taken out of commission. CLIN (contract line items) are entered automatically into the UID database if request for payment was made using a DD250 form and sent using the government portal WAWF. If there is any deviation from that, then third-party reporting software can be used to report.

Since 2005, MIL-STD-130 is most noted for the IUID data matrix, which is a square, pixelated barcode that when scanned connects the DoD user immediately to the record in the DoD UID Database. The UII data matrix does not contain information in itself. The construction rules exist to achieve the desired goal of a truly unique number for all time. There are several label-making software programs and a handful of scanner-verifiers on the market that achieve the required syntax of a DoD UID data matrix. There are also commercial data matrix that do not meet DoD standards, and the software that makes them is far less expensive; while they "look" the same they will not pass verification (a MIL-STD-130 requirement).

When clauses DFARS 252.211-7003 (new purchases) or DFARS 252.211-7007 (government owned equipment) are in the contract, assets and personal property priced at over $5,000 each on the contract or assets in the possession of the contractors costing over $5,000 must be marked with a unique serialized identification number in compliance with MIL-STD-130 either when the government buys them or as they are serviced.

MIL-STD-130 standard requires qualifying government furnished property in possession of contractors (PIPC), and qualifying end item deliverables or legacy items to be marked with a machine-readable 2D data matrix barcode. There are several allowed methods for marking, the most common being a polyester or polyimide label marked with a thermal transfer printer. Other methods are: metal nameplate laser etched, metal plate metalphoto processed, direct part-marked by dot peen, ink jet, laser etch or chemical etch. The barcode must meet several quality specifications, pass a verification process with a grade of "B" or better, and "be as permanent as the normal life expectancy of the item and be capable of withstanding the environmental tests and cleaning procedures specified for the item to which it is affixed".

== Unique identifier (UID) ==
Unique identifier (UID) or (UII), also referred as Item Unique Identification (IUID) in the DoD terminology, marks qualifying tangible items in the form of a number, character string, or sequence of bits assigned to a separate entity or its relevant attribute that uniquely distinguish it from other entities. The construction rules depend upon the serial number being unique to that part number (construct 2) or unique to the company (construct 1). In practice, most companies construct the UID with Cage-part-serial (construct 2). The general custom (not yet a 'shall') is that new acquisitions are marked using cage code in Format 06 (17V, 1P, S), while legacy (older stuff, already owned, or purchased without the DFARS 252.211-7003 clause in the contract) is marked with DoDaac of the entity making the label, in format 06 also (7L, 1P, S). The 17V means cage code and the 7L means DoDaac in the first position.

Construct 1 is a quickie gap-filler that permits printing a string of cage-serial in sequence and carrying the strip to the location to slap them on any kind of item. When reporting these the DoD would like much additional information, anything that can be pulled off the nameplate such as description, manufacturer, dates, and other key info. However, many depots and hired hands doing this labeling are not including any info on what they're reporting so the DoD is going very cold on using Construct 1. Use Construct 1 for new sales ONLY if your plant makes only 1 item, more or less, and your software provides plenty of 'marks'--reports all the info that would exist on a well-filled out product label, including warranty info.

== Processes of choosing MIL-STD-130 ==
It is vital to use durable and permanent label solutions for UID-compliant process. The type of materials can range from aluminium, stainless steel, polyester or polyimide adhesive-backed stickers. However, the UID nameplates must meet MIL-STD-130 standards.

== Revisions of MIL-STD-130 ==
The latest revision of MIL-STD-130 (as of September 2019) is MIL-STD-130N w/Change 1 dated 16 November 2012, superseding MIL-STD-130N dated 17 December 2007.

MIL-STD-130N, which is made up of numerous other governmental and non-governmental specifications, standards, publications, and handbooks, is meant to be used as a guide in which to determine and impose the minimum needs of the government when designing a specific contract. If there any conflicts between MIL-STD-130N and one of the reference documents that are cited in MIL-STD-130N, this standard always takes precedence. For a comprehensive list of these documents, please refer to Section 2 of MIL-STD-130N.

However, there are many items that are excluded from this list, as they are either covered in other documentation, not subject to IUID (Item Unique Identification) marking, or they already carry an IUID-equivalent marking; such as the vehicle identification number (VIN) on a car or an electronic serial number (ESN) of a cell phone. Refer to Section 1.3 of MIL-STD-130N has a complete list of these items.

== Marking specifications ==
For items that are under the control of the Department of Defense and subject for marking, there are many specifications that must be met for a proper mark. These requirements state that all marking must be applied to a metal or stiff plastic identification plate, identification band, identification tag, or identification label that is securely fastened to the item. Additionally, the marking may even be applied directly to the surface of the item itself – provided of course it can still meet the requirements described below.

When possible, the marking must be placed in a location where it will be visible and easily read during normal operation and use of the item, and in a way that ensures the mark is permanent throughout the entire life expectancy of said item. It also necessary to make sure that the marking can withstand normal environmental conditions; including cleaning and rebuilding processes.

If this is not feasible using an MRI (Machine Readable Information) marking, then a marking should be used that will last until the item is expected to be rebuilt, if applicable. In the event that there is not enough open space on an item to ensure a proper IUID, then only the most essential information should be marked. This includes the EID (Enterprise Identifier, which is used to distinguish between different organizations and activities) of the supplier or manufacturer as well as the PIN (Part or Identifying Number), LOT, or batch number of the item. And finally, in the event that there is a lack of room whatsoever in which to place a proper IUID mark on the item, the marking may be placed on the packaging; as long as the mark abides by the guidelines listed in the paragraph above.

For human-readable information, the recommended minimum size for text is 0.2 centimeters, 0.08 inches; this also translates to 5.76 points. All letters should be in a sans-serif font, such as Arial, Futura, Trebuchet, or another sans-serif font, and numbers should be in Arabic numerals. The exception to this is when Roman numerals are used to mark an object, in which case the item's specific documentation and standards should be consulted to determine which font to use. The designation of "U.S." or "US" should be used only when specified elsewhere.

Whenever possible, MRI marking is the preferred method of IUID marking of the Department of Defense – though for some equipment and items free text marking may be specified. Limited to 50 characters in compliance with ISO/IEC 15459–4, all DFARS mandated marks must meet the minimum of a Data Matrix ECC 200 symbol using ISO/IEC 15434 syntax with the semantics of ISO/IEC 15418 or ATA CSDD. For items that are not subject to DFARS mandated marking, the Data Matrix ECC 200 symbol using ISO/IEC 15434 syntax and the semantics of ISO/IEC 15418 or ATA CSDD is preferred.

Unless specified below, MH10.8.7 is the MRI marking protocol that should be used to mark all items.

MIL-STD-130 compliant 2D matrix

An example of a MIL-STD-130 2D matrix using ATA CSDD Text Element Identifiers (TEI) is shown here. Format 12 identifies that TEI are used. Alternatively, format 06 may be used, specifying that Data Identifiers 17V, 1P and S are used instead of MFR, PNO and SEQ. The encoded string is: "[)><RS>12<GS>MFR 12345<GS>PNO 98765<GS>SEQ 0001<RS><EOT>".

"<GS>", "<RS>", and "<EOT>" represent the non-printable ASCII characters 29, 30 and 4 (decimal) respectively. This data matrix identifies an item from manufacturer (MFR) with CAGE 12345 with part number (PNO) 98765 and serial number (SEQ) 0001.

== Industry-specific protocols ==
- ATA (Air Transport Association) should mark all items in accordance with SPEC2000 for linear bar code symbols. For Data Matrix symbols, ATA CSDD and ISO/IEC 15434 syntax with format indicator "12" are to be used.
- AIAG (Automotive Industrial Action Group) should mark all items in accordance with AIAG B-4 and AIAG B-17 standards as applicable.
- Manufacturers using the standards of the Consumer Electronics Association (CEA) should mark all items in accordance with the MH10.8.7 and CEA-706 standards as applicable. Although this protocol allows for other manufacturer codes, a Commercial and Government Entity code (CAGE) code accompanied by the appropriate Data Identifier is recommended as the manufacturer ID.
- Manufacturers using the standards of GS1 should mark all items in accordance with the GS1 standards as applicable.
- For DoD actions that directly support NASA (National Aeronautics and Space Administration), the marking standards of NASA shall be implemented. These standards can be found in NASA-STD-6002; a detailed how-to guide for implementing these standards can be found in NASA-HDBK-6003.
- MRI protocols other than those listed above should be approved by USTRANSCOM TCJ5/4-I Asset Visibility Division. Requests for protocol inclusion can be sent to DOD Logistics AIT Office (TCJ5/4-I), Suite 100, 5971 Kingstowne Village Parkway, Alexandria, Virginia 22315.

== Information contained within an MRI ==
Apart from specifications regarding how to mark an item with an MRI, there are also specifications regarding the minimum amount of information that must be contained within an MRI mark. This encoded information includes:

Non-IUID items

- EID of the manufacturer or supplier of the item
- Serial number or otherwise traceable number of the item
- PIN of the item

IUID items

- EID of the activity that has assigned the serial number for UII Constructs #1 or #2.
- Serial number for UII Constructs #1 or #2.
- Current PIN, lot, or batch number of the item. If this changes, the new PIN, lot, or batch number may be encoded in a single Data Matrix symbol along with the UII data.
- The original PIN, batch, or lot number is used for IUID items that are serialized within a PIN.
- When using Construct #1, the original part number may be used if both the current PIN and original PIN are the same.
- When using Construct #2, the original PIN, lot, or batch number must remain clearly identified and encoded in the MRI. If this number is changed by anyone other than the original manufacturer or supplier, the new PIN, lot, or batch number must also remain clearly identified.

In addition to the standard information contained within an MRI, duplicate items are sometimes assigned a UII (Unique Item Identifier). The UII is a numbered prefix given to items in the event of duplicate part number assignments on behalf of an enterprise so that each individual part can be easily identified.

Of course, there are exceptions to the MRI marking routine as well. COTS (Commercial Off The Shelf) items that are clearly marked with some sort of commercial identification (firm name, logo, trademark, part number, etc.) and are not subject to IUID marking may be exempt from additional marking requirements, as long as the item presents no identification difficulty. Furthermore, parts within an assembly or subassembly that are not expected to be removed, repaired, or replaced are exempt from MRI marking unless it is otherwise stated in the contract.

Legacy items sometimes need to be marked, as well. If it is determined that a legacy machine needs to be marked, the EID used to generate a UII must be of the organization ensuring uniqueness rather than any previous marks.

== Marking quality ==
Finally, there are also specifications regarding the marking quality of an MRI.

- Linear Bar Code: Unless otherwise specified in the contract or order, ISO/IEC 15416 is the protocol for measuring the print quality of a linear bar code.
- Data Matrix Symbol: There are a number of protocols that can be used for measuring the print quality of a data matrix symbol, at the supplier's discretion. This includes ISO/IEC 15415, AIM DPM-1-2006, or SAE AS9132. If a data matrix symbol is ever found to be erroneous, unreadable, or otherwise unacceptable, two diagonal lines should be used to cross out the symbol in addition to two other lines (one horizontal, one vertical) through the two interrupted frame lines.

== Marking arrangements ==
In a case where the manufacturer is also the ODA (Original Design Activity), the marking should be arranged as follows:

- ODA – CAGE or NCAGE (NATO Commercial and Government Agency) – 1234567–101.

When a manufacturer is the CDA (Current Design Activity) but not the ODA, the following mark should be included in addition to the one above:

- CDA – CAGE or NCAGE.

Parts acquired from a manufacturer other than the design activity should have their markings arranged as follows:

- ODA – 1234567-101
- MFR – CAGE or NCAGE

When the design activity is not the original activity, markings should be as follows:

- ODA – 1234567-101
- CDA – CAGE or NCAGE
- MFR – CAGE or NCAGE

Assemblies and subassemblies that do not require identification plates should be marked as above, though the abbreviation "ASSY" should be included instead of a dash as follows:

- CAGE or NCAGE, ASSY, 7654321-101

Likewise, source control items should use the abbreviation "SOCN" in place of "ASSY" above.

The free text marking for units, groups, and sets should be arranged as follows:

- Nomenclature, EID of the manufacturer or supplier, EID for IUID as applicable, serial or other traceable number, current PIN, original PIN, LOT, or batch number for IUID as applicable, acquisition instrument identification number.

Any maintenance actions that are performed on any item should be marked as follows:

- EID of the repair facility, date of repair, applicable warranty extensions, contract, purchase, or repair order number
- ESDS (Electrostatic Discharge Sensitive) items and other electronic parts that are susceptible to damage from electrostatic discharge should be marked with the ESDS symbol.

== Non-exhaustive list of documents ==
- CAGE, a standardized method of identifying a given facility at a specific location
- MIL-STD-105, Sampling Procedures and Tables for Inspection by Attributes (withdrawn)
- MIL-STD-129, a standard is used for maintaining uniformity while marking
- MIL-STD-130, a standard that is mandated by the DoD for any item to be UID Compliance
- MIL-STD-498, on software development and documentation

== Specifications ==
There are certain engineering documentation terms of military products which might not go in accordance with the American Identification languages. The section 3 of the standard clearly specifies those terms and helps product designers in offering a lucid definition about the items created for military.

It is mandatory for product designers to develop their products by adhering to the criteria set by the MIL-STD-130N standard. Merely setting the definition of product in accordance with the standard is not enough. The product designers have to take care of everything to satisfy the criteria. Item identification marking 'free text' often includes more information. A good designer retains all former part marking if an existing part, or typical part marking for a new part, then assigns a rectangular spot nearby for the UID, which is an additional label or small metal plate approximately where shown that contains the data matrix plus the 3 HRI that comprise the data matrix.

The requirement for the 3 HRI to be adjacent and unambiguous to the data matrix is a MIL-STD-130 requirement. There is no requirement it match the other part marking, for instance if the item were outsourced or is off-the-shelf, in which case the entity holding the Gov. contract may assign it their own part number and/or serial other than what exists on the product, and because they are labeling it will assign it their own cage code. A good example of this is a laptop used as an equipment controller; while it has a permissible ID on it, a company may wish to stick to cage-part-serial for ease of reporting and use their internal part number to report it because that's how they keep revision control for service purposes.

The most common designations for the adjacent HRI are MFR, PNO or P/N, and SER. MIL-STD-130N narrowed up the choices significantly, so drawings from pre-2008 may now show designations no longer preferred. Some companies simply use the designations 17V, 1P and S, which are surprising easy to adjust to.

== See also ==
- American National Standards Institute
- International standard
- MIL-STD-129
- Military Connector Specifications
- Specification
- Standardisation
- United States Military Standard
