= Nameplate =

Object used to indicate something's or someone's name

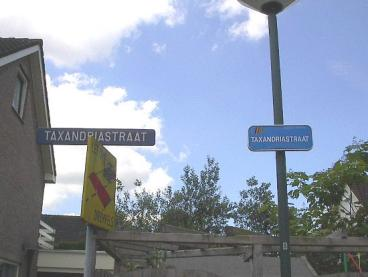
Belgian and Dutch street nameplates on the border

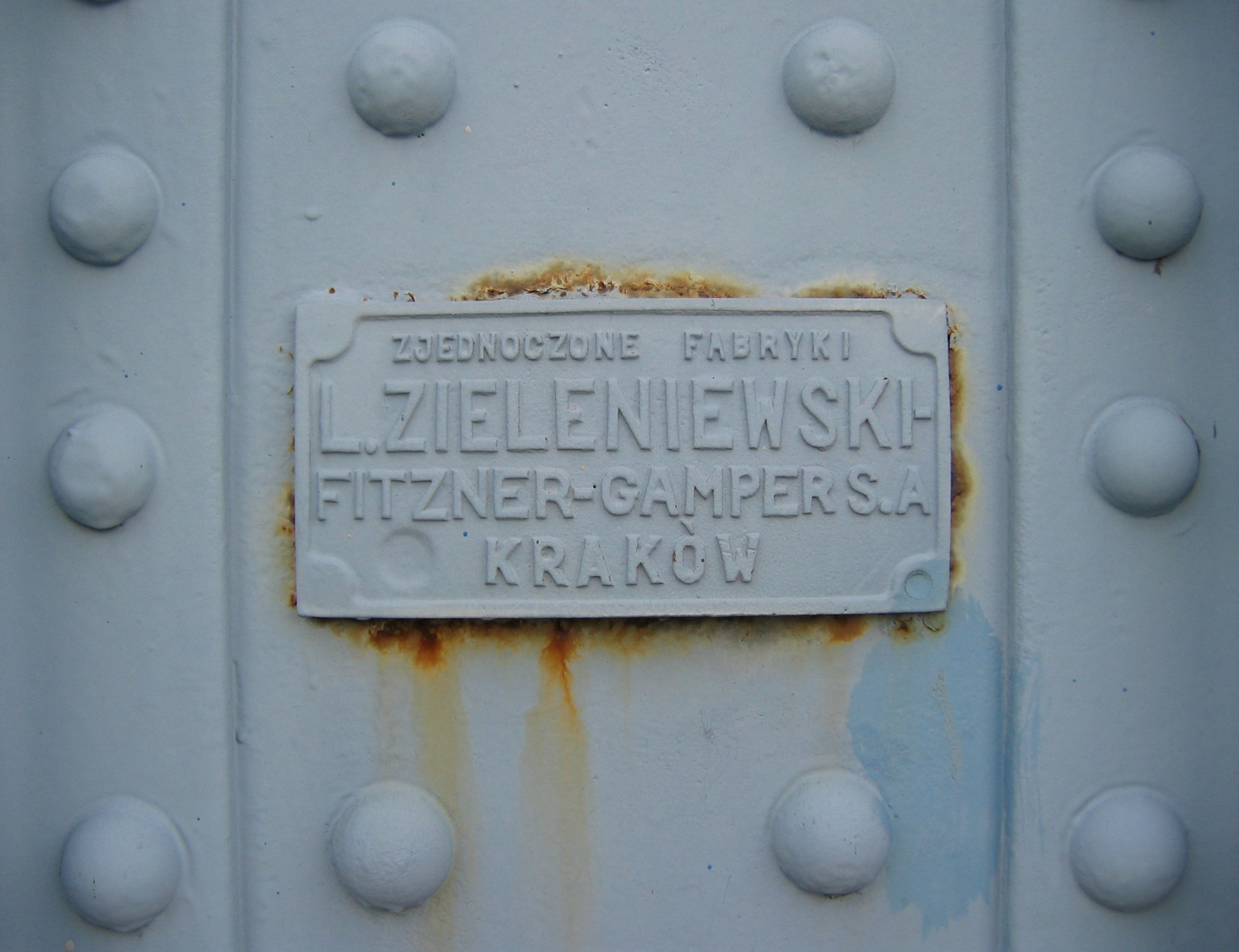
Manufacturer's details on a plate on a bridge in Kraków, Poland

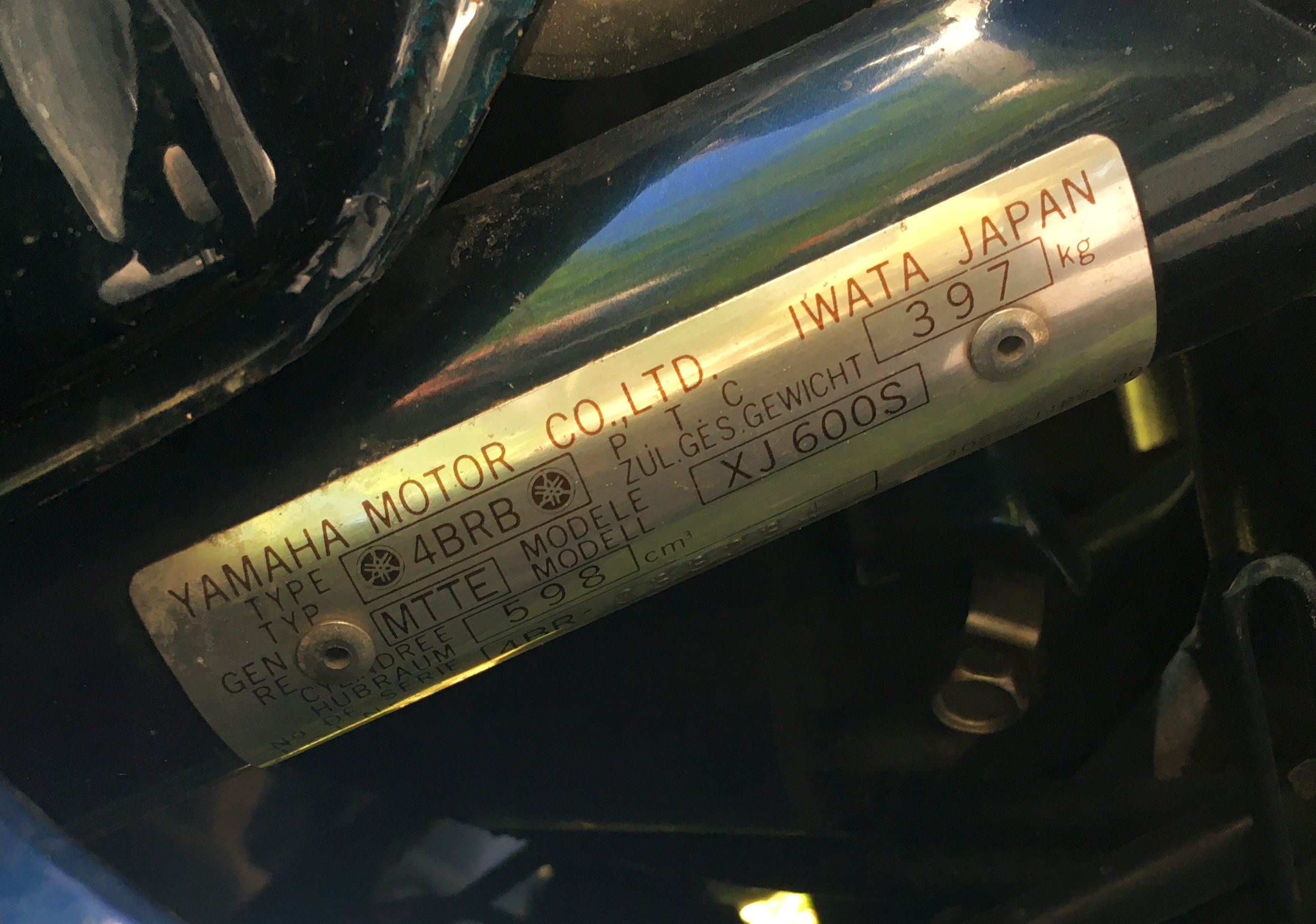
Type label behind the handlebar on a Yamaha motorcycle

A nameplate identifies and displays a person or product's name. Nameplates are usually shaped as rectangles but are also seen in other shapes, sometimes taking on the shape of someone's written name. Nameplates primarily serve an informative function (as in an office environment, where nameplates mounted on doors or walls identify employees' spaces) or a commercial role (as in a retail environment, where nameplates are mounted on products to identify the brand). Whereas name tags tend to be worn on uniforms or clothing, nameplates tend to be mounted onto an object (e.g. cars, amplification devices) or physical space (e.g. doors, walls, or desktops). Nameplates are also distinct from name plaques. Plaques have larger dimensions and aim to communicate more information than a name and title.

== Office nameplates ==
Office nameplates generally are made out of plastic, wood, metals (stainless steel, brass, aluminium, zinc, copper) and usually contain one or two lines of text. The standard format for an office nameplate is to display a person's name on the first line and a person's job title on the second line. It is common for organizations to request nameplates that exclude the job title. The primary reasons for excluding job titles are to extend the longevity of a nameplate and to promote a culture of meritocracy, where the strength of one's thoughts are not connected to one's job title. Nameplates without job titles have longer lives because someone can reuse the same nameplate after changing job titles. It is rare for an office nameplate to contain three or more lines of text. Although office nameplates range in size, the most popular nameplate size is 2 by 8 inches (5.08 cm × 20.32 cm). Office nameplates typically are made out of plastic. This is because plastic is an inexpensive material relative to wood and metal. More expensive nameplates can be manufactured out of bronze. To promote consistency, organizations tend to use the same style nameplate for all employees. This helps to achieve a standard look. Office nameplates are not restricted to for-profit enterprises. Many non-profit and governmental agencies have a need for nameplates. For plastic and wooden nameplates, the names are etched into the material through a number of processes, including mechanical engraving, laser engraving, or whittling.

== Personal nameplates ==
Nameplates are also popular for personal reasons. Parents often like to adorn the doors of their children's rooms with nameplates. These nameplates are conventionally crafted out of wood, not plastic or metal. Because the nameplates are meant for children, these personal nameplates tend to come in fun shapes. Examples of fun shapes include teddy bears, bluebirds, dogs, and the child's name. These nameplates also tend to be more colorful than office nameplates. Mounting options are either by nail or by adhesive. Wooden nameplates are not normally glued onto doors, as the glue may leave a messy residue and make it harder to remove the nameplate. Larger personal nameplates also include graphics or artwork, such as a horse or a baseball bat, that match the interests of the identified person. The graphics or artwork reinforce the individuality and personalization established by the nameplate.

There is a growing trend to use nameplates for vanity purposes. In these cases, the nameplates are fashioned out of gold, silver, or other metals and worn as a form of jewellery. These nameplates are similar to vanity plates found on automobiles. They are available in a multitude of styles and colors, ranging from bronze to pink. Most commonly, these vanity nameplates are worn as necklaces or bracelets.

== Nameplate holders ==
Nameplates are usually sold as two separate components: the manufactured nameplate insert and the nameplate holder. This setup allows the nameplate insert to be used in a variety of settings depending on the specific holder—the same plastic, wood, or metal nameplate insert can usually be removed and reinserted into another holder style with minimal effort; thereby creating a new nameplate application. Various nameplate holders range from wall and door mounts, desk holders, to cubicle hangers.

== Nameplates on products ==
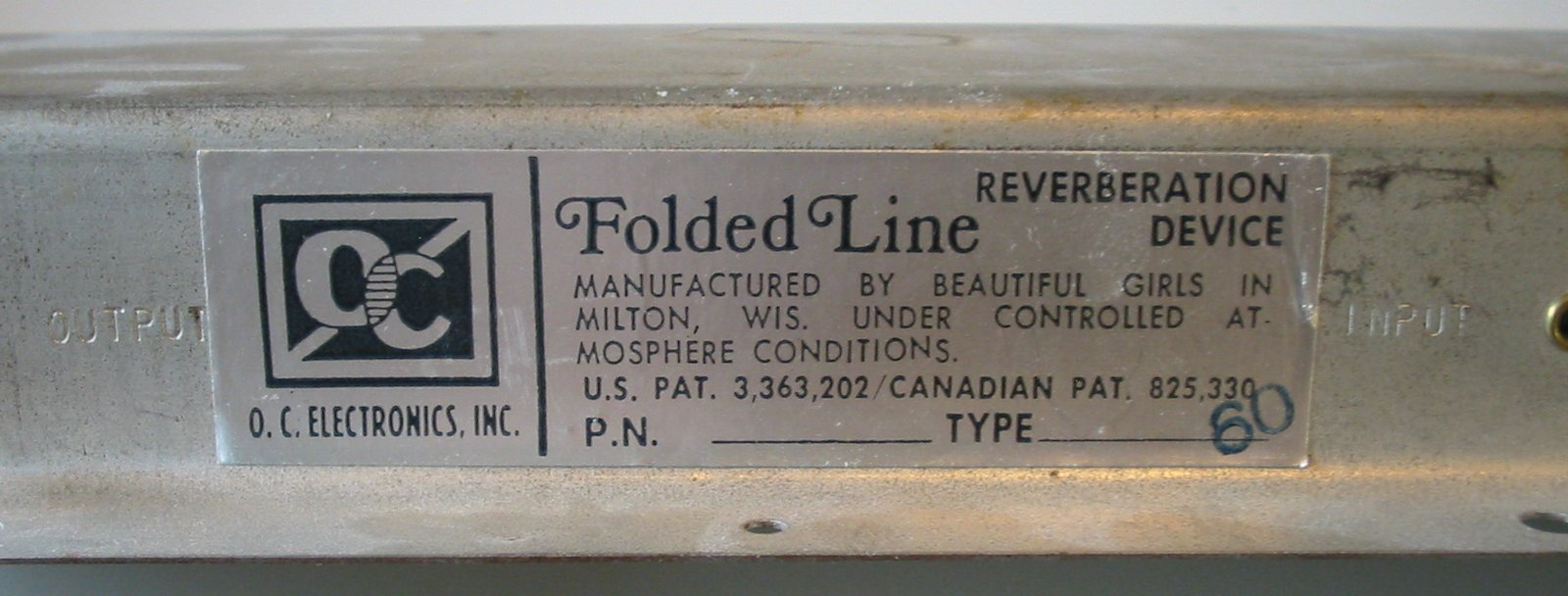
Nameplate of a reverberation device

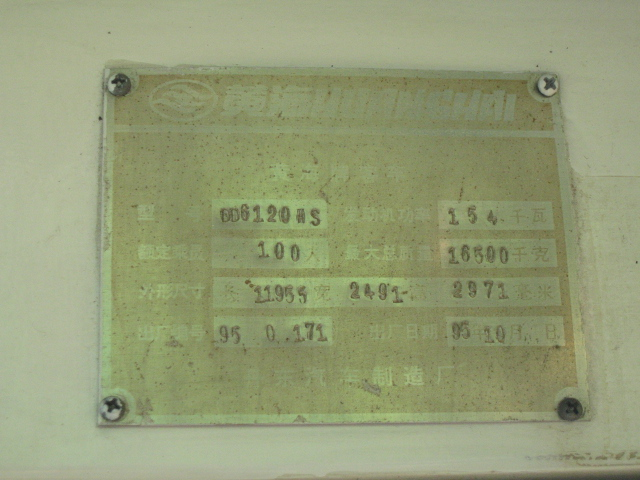
Nameplate of a Huanghai bus

Nameplates are used on many products to designate the producer, the brand, and/or the product name, as well as properties of the product such as power and mass. Additionally, they may be placed on a product for decorative value, for placement of product information (e.g. serial code), or for approval/recognition (e.g. an endorsement by a governing body). When strategically placed on a product, nameplates often extend the impact of a logo or brand and heighten the connection to the value of the product. Many nameplates must meet certain requirements for print life, and environmental tolerances base on location or environment the product might be used in.

Nameplates differ from labels in that they are usually designed for long term product marking. They are usually under printed on some sort of transparent material with an industrial grade adhesive or mechanical attachment.

Modern manufacturing processes allow for diverse styles of nameplate design. Nameplates can be two- or three-dimensional; made of various metals (aluminum, zinc), stainless steel or brass, human-made materials (e.g. Mylar or Vinyl polymers) or injection-molded plastic; and thickness, color, and size can all be customized. Additional design features and production techniques common to nameplate manufacturing include etching, branding, and engraving.

Nameplates can be mounted or bound to the object that they are labeling by rivets, screws, or adhesive.

== Graphic overlay nameplates ==
Graphic overlay nameplates are constructed from hard-coated polycarbonate, hard-coated polyester or UV resistant polyester. Graphic overlay nameplates differ from generic nameplates in that they feature transparent windows, selective texturing, embossing, abrasion protection and chemical resistance. A graphic overlay is usually over some sort of LEDs, windows, switch, or control panel.

A graphic overlay is a screen or digitally printed product incorporating processes such as embossing, selective texturing and transparent display windows. Not only does a graphic overlay provide aesthetic appeal to a device, but it can also provide environmental protection. A graphic overlay can be used in an assembly using discrete switches or laminated to a membrane switch.

== Nameplates used in industry ==
Industrial strength nameplates are required to withstand harsher operating environments compared to those used in the home and office. All industries that require long term product identification or marking used nameplates for branding, identification, instructions, and other marketings. Industrial nameplate manufacturers can offer a variety of different nameplates for a wide range of applications. The properties of the nameplates that vary from application to application include: Material (including aluminum, stainless steel, brass, zinc, Copper or titanium), thickness, Custom Graphics, Screen printing, Etching, and Anodizing, Photosensitive Anodized Aluminum, Adhesive backing, UL and CSA approval, Serialization, Military Standards and Embossing. The Japanese term for nameplate in industrial use is meiban (銘板).

A motor nameplate typically states the power rating in horsepower or watts as well as the full load amperage and rated voltage among other specifications.

== Rail transport usage ==
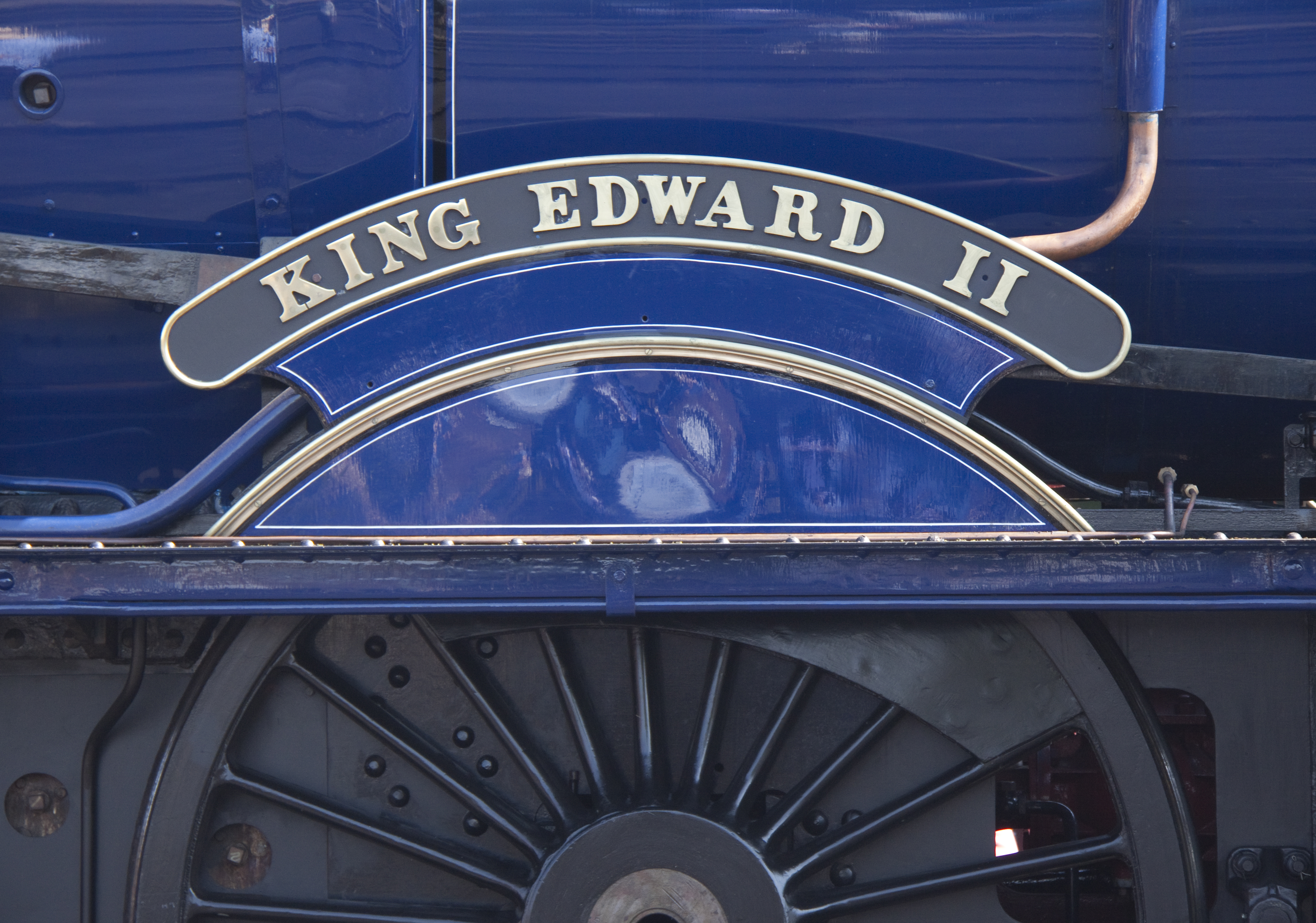
Nameplate of BR steam locomotive no. 6023

In rail transport, a nameplate is a plate attached to a locomotive or other item of rolling stock that carries a name. Nameplates are often collected as memorabilia.

== See also ==
- Badge
- Builder's plate
- Head badge
- Label
- Name tag
- Rating plate
- Vehicle Identification Number (VIN)
- Vehicle registration plate
