= Trading Partner Identification Number =

The Trading Partner Identification Number (or TPIN) is a confidential number assigned to organizations which are or intend to be contractors to the Federal Government of the United States. It is issued by the Central Contractor Registration (CCR) of the Department of Defense. Contractors are consistently advised by CCR to treat the TPIN as if it were a password, and not to reveal it to others not directly involved in their business operations.

A T.P.I.N. is obtained by any organization that may need it via an SSL connection over the Internet from the CCR.

== See also ==
- Commercial and Government Entity code issued by the Defense Logistics Information Service (DLIS) to identify suppliers to the Department of Defense.
- Employer identification number issued by the IRS
- D.U.N.S. number issued by Dun & Bradstreet
