= Item Unique Identification =

Identifying the universal own property

Unique Identification Marking, UID marking, Item Unique Identification or IUID, is a part of the compliance process mandated by the United States Department of Defense. It is a permanent marking method used to give equipment a unique ID. Marking is essential for all equipment with an acquisition cost of over $5,000, equipment which is mission essential, controlled inventory, or serially-controlled. UID-marking is a set of data for assets that is globally unique and unambiguous. The technology used to mark an item is 2D Data Matrix ECC 200 Symbol. UID marking can be used to ensure data integrity and data quality throughout an item's lifecycle; it also supports multi-faceted business applications.

As per the memorandum issued by the Department of Defense (DoD), UID-marking is a must for all solicitations issued on or after Jan. 1, 2005. Also the US Department of Defense has made it mandatory for all federal contractors to have UID-marking on their government furnished military and non-military equipment by September 30, 2007. Only after the products have UID-marking containing uniquely identified numbers, they are eligible for IUID Registry.

== Description ==
Tangible items are distinguished from one another by the assignment of a unique identifier in the form of a unique data string and encoded in a bar code placed on the item. An item unique identifier is only assigned to a single item and is never reused. Once assigned to an item, the IUID is never changed even if the item is modified or re-engineered. IUID is similar to social security numbering used to distinguish citizens of the United States from one another.

In the case of a lot or batch of items that are not individually serialized, the entire lot or batch may have a unique identifier assigned. For example, a manufacturer might place a unique IUID physical mark on the exterior of a kit or container that holds a gross quantity of mission critical items. The government would refer to this IUID at the point of acceptance. The entire gross quantity in this case is treated as a single item. In this case, the IUID is no longer useful after the items are separated, and the individual items from the batch or lot are never uniquely identified.

IUID is physically marked on tangible items or assets using a two-dimensional (2D) Data Matrix symbol with the data formatted in accordance with specified standards. The encoded data is identified by the use of data identifiers, application identifiers or text element identifiers. The choice of which identifier to use is based upon normal industry practices of the organization assigning the serialization. The formatted data is called a Unique Item Identifier (UII). The Data Matrix symbol is a machine-readable representation of the UII.

When DoD requires this marking it shall be applied directly to the surface of the item or shall be applied to an identification plate, tag or label securely fastened to the item. The UII is intended to be a permanent mark and cannot be changed over the life of the item.

To create a compliant unique item identifier, all required information about the part and the organization producing it is linked together – concatenated – into a single data field of up to 50 numeric, alphabetic or alphanumeric characters. This data must be entered into the IUID Registry to “ensure uniqueness” of each item submitted for listing in the registry. This unique item identifier can also see use within manufacturing, maintenance and logistics organizations for any number of varied purposes.

Marking of tangible items or assets in accordance with IUID policy is mandated by incorporating Defense Federal Acquisition Regulation Supplement (DFARS) clause 252-211-7003 in DoD contracts.

== Application ==
Per the UID standard, a 2D Data Matrix bar code that is applied with either direct part UID-marking techniques or labels must also prove to be generated to a level of quality that meets the standards set by the International Organization for Standardization (ISO) and the Society of Automotive Engineers (SAE). UID Markings and 2D Matrix Barcode Symbols can be created on a variety of surfaces. Generally UCC.EAN, ANSI MH 10.8.2 or ATA style descriptors are used for UID-marking symbol. Vendors supplying parts to the Department of Defense are required to supply parts with UID Data Matrix Symbols conforming to MIL-STD 130M standard. By using a Data Matrix Symbol laser etching system to engrave a UID onto each part, items can be uniquely identified by manufacturer, part number and serial number.

== Marking methodology ==
UID bar code must be maintained as a readable bar code throughout the entire life of the item; hence strong consideration must be given to the UID-marking methodology. Metal tag with a permanent adhesive or durable polyester label are suitable for many environments but other marking items such as laser etch, dot peen, Metalphoto photosensitive anodized aluminum, chemical etch or ink jet can also be used for direct part Unique Identification.

The following methodologies (constructs) and equivalents are approved:

- UID Construct 1, composed of Issuing Agency Code, an Enterprise Identifier, and a Serial Number unique within the Enterprise
- UID Construct 2, composed of Issuing Agency Code, an Enterprise Identifier, a Part Number and a Serial Number (unique within the Part Number)

The following IUID Equivalents are also approved:

- Vehicle Identification Number (VIN)
- Global Returnable Asset Identifier (GRAI)
- Global Individual Asset Identifier (GIAI)
- Electronic Serial Number (ESN), typically assigned to cell phones

Accepted Issuing Agencies:

- DoD and NATO (CAGE or NCAGE)
- D-U-N-S (Dun & Bradstreet)
- GS1 (formerly EAN/UCC)

== Policy ==
Department of Defense Instruction (DoDI) 8320.04 mandates that the following tangible items are marked with an item unique identifier:

- All delivered items for which the Government’s unit acquisition cost is $5,000 or more
- Items for which the Government’s unit acquisition cost is less than $5,000, when identified by the requiring activity as serially managed, mission essential, or controlled inventory;
  - Serially Managed - When DoD elects to serially manage an item it becomes "DoD serially managed". This means it is a tangible item used by DoD, which is designated by a DoD, or Service Item Manager to be uniquely tracked, controlled or managed in maintenance, repair and/or supply by means of its serial number.
  - Mission Essential - A measure of an item's military worth in terms of how its failure (if a replacement is not immediately available) would affect the ability of a weapon system, end item, or organization to perform its intended functions. (DoD 4140.1-R)
  - Controlled Inventory - Those items that are designated as having characteristics that require that they be identified, accounted for, segregated, or handled in a special manner to ensure their safeguard and integrity. Includes classified items (require protection in the interest of national security), sensitive items (require a high degree of protection and control due to statutory requirements or regulations, such as precious metals; items of high value, highly technical, or hazardous nature; and small arms), and pilferable items (items having a ready resale value or application to personal possession, which are especially subject to theft) (DoD 4140.1-R); and safety controlled items.
- Items for which the Government’s unit acquisition cost is less than $5,000, when the requiring activity determines that permanent identification is required; and
- Regardless of value—
  - Any DoD serially managed subassembly, component, or part embedded within a delivered item; and
  - The parent item (as defined in 252.211-7003(a)) that contains the embedded subassembly, component, or part.

Responsibility - Often, the question of responsibility for IUID comes into light when multiple organization are involved in the production and/or procurement of items. According to the guidance, IUID is required at the component level based on a program manager determination. Program managers should be interpreted as any activity member who manages the requirement for procurement of an item. This would include personnel such as Integrated Support Team Managers, Systems Managers, or Item Managers.

The prime contractor is responsible for ensuring uniqueness. The prime contractor can direct their vendors to use the prime's EID. However, from a manufacturing process perspective, this may not be the most efficient and effective way for their vendors to mark parts. If the item does not already have unique identification and meets IUID criteria, the enterprise furnishing the item to the Government must provide unique item identification marking as part of the purchase price. In situations where sub-contractors are furnishing items to the prime contractor, it is the responsibility of the prime contractor to ensure that the items are marked in accordance with the IUID requirements prior to furnishing to the Government, either by flowing down the requirements to the subcontractor or marking the item themselves. The prime will also have the added responsibility of ensuring uniqueness of the subcontractor's serial number within the prime's enterprise (Construct #1) or the subcontractor's serial number within the subcontractor's part number within the prime's enterprise (Construct #2).

== Compliance ==
Marking and printing is the first and foremost step of the UID Compliance process. This marking is nothing but the 2D data matrix code. Dot peen, chemical etch, laser mark, durable polyester or ink jet are generally used for marking. After conforming to the set standards with regard to printing and marking, the next step is syntax and formatting. Before the items are ready to be received they must be scanned and tracked for checking accuracy and hence this step is crucial. Then comes the reporting phase where the UID meeting requirements are tracked to the item-specific location. The IUID data is submitted to the WAWF (Wide Area Work Flow) and UID Registry In the last step of IUID compliance. All the contracts, deliverables and government properties, that meet the criteria, possessed by the contractors need to be marked with this 2D data matrix code standard.

It is mandatory for all suppliers to be UID Compliant who deliver their items to the DoD. All the items and properties either owned by or in the contract with the [DoD], and that meet the criteria, need to be identified with a unique serialized identification number and for them UID Compliance standard is obligatory. This identification number is very essential for meeting the MIL STD 130 standards.

== Terminology ==
IUID - Item Unique Identification is the strategic system implemented by the DoD to enhance the traceability of the property.

UID - Unique Identification, the term UID is commonly used for different things and sometimes used in place of IUID, and thus can be a source of confusion. Generally, "The UID" refers to the physical mark on the asset or the UID Label.

UII - The Unique Item Identifier is a set of data for an asset(s) that is globally unique and unambiguous, ensures data integrity and data quality throughout life, and supports multi-faceted business applications and users.

2D Matrix - The 2D Data Matrix symbol marked on the item contains data compression, redundancy, and additional information to aid in decoding. This information can be translated by an MRI device (per ISO-15343) and concatenated into a human-readable string of 50 characters or less per MIL-STD-130N. (Note that this limit was previously 78 characters in MIL-STD-130M, superseded in December 2007.) The human-readable concatenated UII (Unique Item Identifier) is properly referred to as the IUII or "Individual Unique Item Identifier". The IUII provides a high probability of being globally unique, regardless of context.

IUID Registry - The U.S. Federal Government maintains an IUID Registry data system to store records for all assets marked and delivered to the government or are in the custody of contractors. The registry also stores "Virtual IUID" information for assets that fall under IUID criteria but are unable to be marked (mainly due to asset location constraints) The IUID Registry can be publicly accessed online.

Virtual IUID - Asset data is uploaded to the registry as with normal IUID but the asset is not physically marked until a trigger event occurs (such as maintenance, transportation, or inspection). Commonly used when an asset is located overseas or in use and scheduled to return to a central location.

== UID enumeration ==
The following enumeration constructs are approved:

- UID Construct 1, composed of Issuing Agency Code, an Enterprise Identifier, and a Serial Number unique within the Enterprise
- UID Construct 2, composed of Issuing Agency Code, an Enterprise Identifier, a Part Number or Batch/Lot Code, and a Serial Number (unique within the Part Number)
- Vehicle Identification Number (VIN)
- Global Returnable Asset Identifier (GRAI)
- Global Individual Asset Identifier (GIAI)
- Electronic Serial Number (ESN), typically assigned to cell phones

== See also ==
- MIL STD 129
- MIL STD 130
- UID Compliance
