= ISO 8000 =

International standard for Data Quality and Enterprise Master Data

ISO 8000 is the international standard for Data Quality and Master Data. Widely adopted internationally it describes the features and defines the requirements for standard exchange of Master Data among business partners. It establishes the concept of Portability as a requirement for Master Data, and the concept that true Master Data is unique to each organization.

ISO 8000 is one of the emerging technology standards that organizations use in order to improve data quality and business processes, and to support system integration, for example in the implementation of Enterprise Resource Planning (ERP) systems.

== Function ==
When standardized to comply with ISO 8000, master data is used to manage critical business information, most commonly in the context of a digital supply chain although also used across public services e.g. health, about products, services and materials, constituents, clients and counterparties, and for certain immutable transactional and operational records.

ISO 8000 standards are international standards and are part of a wider group of standards for data quality that include ISO 8601 Formatting of date and time, ISO 22745-10 Open technical dictionaries (metadata and reference data), ISO 22745-30 Formatting data requirement statements (templates) and ISO 25500 for Supply Chain Interoperability and Integration.

== Usage ==
Application of the ISO 8000 standard to master data is intended to improve data quality and data portability and so reduce procurement costs, promote inventory optimization, and deliver greater efficiency and cost savings in supply chain management.

Government agencies in major economies involved in the supervision and regulation of financial and commodities markets, telecommunications, media, high technology and military have adopted ISO 8000 Master Data strategies, and several are establishing audits and controls based upon ISO 8000.

By defining requirements for data quality and data portability in corporate master data, ISO 8000 supports the principles of the EU Open Data Directive (2019) for example by enabling “data to be available in real time and via APIs”. Use of ISO 8000 to standardize data within product technical specifications (compliant to ISO 8000-115) supports international trade initiatives such as the EU Digital Product Passport (2024) regulations, whose ambition is to provide comprehensive, standardized, accessible product data openly available to anyone.

== Origin ==
ISO 8000 is maintained by the International Organization for Standardization (ISO). It was first proposed in 2002, and the first components were approved in 2009. It has been updated subsequently since then. Its originating principles derive from the NATO Codification System for creating standardized descriptions for product items procured via the supply chain and held in inventory.

ISO 8000 is developed by ISO technical committee TC 184, Automation systems and integration, sub-committee SC 4, Industrial data. Member nations of ISO/TC 184/SC4 represent 80% of world GDP. Like other ISO and IEC standards, ISO 8000 is copyrighted and is not freely available.

== Structure ==
ISO 8000 describes the requirements for data to be structured to

- identify companies
- identify product/service part numbers
- exchange product/service technical specifications
- identify natural locations
- identify the provenance of the data

Part 114, which describes the "Application of ISO/IEC 21778 and ISO 8000-115 to portable data" was approved in 2024. Part 115, which describes "Quality Identifier Prefixes" for "Quality Identifiers," was approved in 2017 and updated in 2024. Part 116, which describes the "exchange of quality identifiers and the application of ISO 8000-115 to authoritative legal entity identifiers", was approved in 2019 (see the Key Concepts, below). Part 118, which describes the "Application of ISO 8000-115 to natural location identifiers" was approved in 2025.

Parts 1, 2 and 8 of the standard are ISO horizontal deliverables, identifying them as applicable to all sectors.

== Key Concepts ==
Master Data
Master data represents the business objects which are agreed on and shared across the enterprise. It can cover relatively static reference data, transactional, unstructured, analytical, hierarchical and metadata. It is the primary focus of the discipline of Master Data Management (MDM). This discipline used to be predominantly taken care of by Information Technology (IT) departments but can equally well be justified as a business function, with IT providing the required technology.
Quality Identifier
A Quality Identifier is an internal product or services identifier or key that is issued and "owned" by an organization and used to resolve a product or service to the minimum ISO 8000 quality data set required to validate the identifier.
SmartPrefix
An ISO 8000-115 SmartPrefix is a unique name or alpha-numeric character string that is used by manufacturers and distributors to uniquely identify products and replacements parts and link them to corresponding ISO Technical Specifications (ISO/TS).
Authoritative Legal Entity Identifier (ALEI)
An ISO 8000-116 ALEI is an identifier issued by the administrative agency for the governing body of a nation, state, or community for a physical or juridical person for which they have granted legal status. The International Business Registration Number is an example of this approach.
Authoritative Item Identifier
An AII is a primary key or system identifier for a product or service that is defined in a dictionary and in an ISO 22745 XML specification in standard format that uses property or attribute value pairs for the item characteristics.
Portability
Data portability is achieved when data is formatted using an agreed and known syntax and when the semantic encoding of the content is explicit.

== Published parts ==
The following parts have already been published:

- ISO/TS 8000-1:2022, Data quality — Part 1: Overview
- ISO 8000-2:2022, Data quality — Part 2: Vocabulary
- ISO 8000-8:2015, Data quality — Part 8: Information and data quality: Concepts and measuring
- ISO 8000-51:2023, Data quality — Part 51: Data governance: Exchange of data policy statements
- ISO 8000-61:2016, Data quality — Part 61: Data quality management: Process reference model
- ISO 8000-62:2018, Data quality — Part 62: Data quality management: Organizational process maturity assessment: Application of standards relating to process assessment
- ISO 8000-63:2019, Data quality — Part 63: Data quality management: Process measurement
- ISO 8000-64:2022, Data quality — Part 64: Data quality management: Organizational process maturity assessment: Application of the Test Process Improvement method
- ISO 8000-66:2021, Data quality — Part 66: Data quality management: Assessment indicators for data processing in manufacturing operations
- ISO 8000-100:2016, Data quality — Part 100: Master data: Exchange of characteristic data: Overview
- ISO 8000-102:2009, Data quality — Part 102: Master data: Exchange of characteristic data: Vocabulary (Withdrawn)
- ISO 8000-110:2021, Data quality — Part 110: Master data: Exchange of characteristic data: Syntax, semantic encoding, and conformance to data specification
- ISO 8000-114:2024, Data quality, Part 114: Master data: Application of ISO/IEC 21778 and ISO 8000-115 to portable data
- ISO 8000-115:2024, Data quality — Part 115: Master data: Exchange of quality identifiers: Syntactic, semantic and resolution requirements
- ISO 8000-116:2019, Data quality — Part 116: Master data: Exchange of quality identifiers: Application of ISO 8000-115 to authoritative legal entity identifiers
- ISO 8000-117:2023, Data quality — Part 117: Application of ISO 8000-115 to identifiers in distributed ledgers including blockchains
- ISO 8000-118:2025, Data quality — Part 118: Application of ISO 8000-115 to natural location identifiers
- ISO 8000-120:2016, Data quality — Part 120: Master data: Exchange of characteristic data: Provenance
- ISO 8000-130:2016, Data quality — Part 130: Master data: Exchange of characteristic data: Accuracy
- ISO 8000-140:2016, Data quality — Part 140: Master data: Exchange of characteristic data: Completeness
- ISO 8000-150:2022, Data quality — Part 150: Data quality management: Roles and responsibilities
- ISO 8000-210:2024, Data quality — Part 210: Sensor data: Data quality characteristics
- ISO 8000-220:2025, Data quality — Part 220: Sensor data: Quality measurement
- ISO/TS 8000-311:2012, Data quality — Part 311: Guidance for the application of product data quality for shape (PDQ-S)

== See also ==
- Authoritative Legal Entity Identifier
- Data quality
- International Business Registration Number
- Linked data
- Master data
- Master data management
