= MIL-STD-129 =

MIL-STD-129 standard is used for maintaining uniformity while marking military equipment and supplies that are transported through ships. This standard has been approved to be used by the United States Department of Defense and all other government agencies. Items must be marked for easy identification before they are transported. The marking helps the military personnel to fill the necessary requisition, when a particular stock goes short of the balance level.

== Container Categories ==
Shipping containers carrying military items can be categorized into 3 types: namely Unit Containers, Intermediate Containers and Exterior Containers, as per the requirement standard of MIL-STD-129. However, for all types of containers, basic format items such as National Stock Number (NSN), item description, and part number are mandatory. For Exterior Containers, certain additional labels like Military Shipment Label (MSL), serial number, barcode, and Direct-Vendor Delivery label (DVD) are required.

== Change Notice 4 ==
Major changes to MIL-STD-129 came with Revision P's Change Notice 4, known as MIL-STD-129P (4), released on 19 September 2007. There is an amendment for Exterior Containers in this new MIL-STD-129P (4) standard. In addition to the preexisting requirement for NSN, Contract, and CAGE bar codes, Change Notice 4 introduced two new bar codes mandatory for Exterior Containers: the Contract Line Item (CLIN) and Shipment Numbers (SN). Two-dimensional PDF417 bar code symbols were introduced to identify UID-marked contents.

=== Highlights of Change Notice 4 ===
- Serial numbers are assigned in "SER NO" format.
- The description of items should be exactly as per the contract.
- There should be spaces or dashes in NSN.
- Barcode information is also required. For shipments that include UII items, a single two-dimensional barcode (PDF417) is required. For shipments that do not include UII items, the barcodes should be (MIL-STD-129, para 4.4.1.2):
  - NSN/NATO stock number (without dashes, spaces, prefix or suffix unless other specified in contract), if one is assigned
  - Contract or Order Number
  - CAGE of the Prime Contractor
  - CLIN (when used)
  - Contract Shipment Number
  - Serial Number(s)

== Revision R ==
Revision R to Mil-Std-129 went into effect February 18, 2014. A primary focus of the revision was the use of two-dimensional PDF417 bar code symbols to replace linear bar codes on all container identification labels. The use of PDF417 symbols on container labels was introduced in Change Notice 4 to facilitate the demands of Unique Identification (UID) markings, which at up to fifty characters in length are too long to be represented with traditional Code39 linear bar codes.

Prior to Revision R, a container label would require up to ten linear bar codes for NSN, Contract, CLIN, CAGE, shipment number and up to five serial numbers. The PDF417 is a very dense machine-readable symbol that may easily contain the data of those barcodes, plus five full-length IUIDs (Item Unique Identifiers).

While this change has reduced the number of labels required, there are other benefits to both vendors and the DOD. For the DOD, the use of the PDF417 allows the depots to read the labels with automated data collection systems, which is virtually impossible with the linear barcodes due to the lack of data identifiers. Defense contractors can benefit from this same capability in their own warehouse systems.

== See also ==
- MIL STD 130
- MIL-STD-130N
- UID Compliance
- UID-marking
