= Authoritative Legal Entity Identifier =

- Acronym: ALEI
- Example: US-DE.BER:3031657

An Authoritative Legal Entity Identifier (ALEI) is the identifier assigned by a government jurisdiction authorized by statute or decree to create a legal entity and to maintain the authoritative registries of legal entities. ALEIs are used within supply chain data, ERP applications and master data management systems to support accurate and consistent identification of entities in digital records, supply chains, and government databases.

ALEIs are described in the international standard ISO 8000-116, which outlines a structured format that makes the locally unique identifier into a globally unique one and ensures global interoperability and data quality.

== Structure ==
An ALEI is composed of three main components: a prefix that identifies the jurisdiction and register, a subdomain element (optional), and the local registration number of the entity. For example, the identifier "US-DE.BER:3031657" refers to an entity registered in the Delaware Business Entity Register in the United States.

The standardization of this structure is governed by ISO 8000-116, which is designed to ensure each ALEI is globally unique and resolvable.

== Comparison with other identifiers ==
ALEIs differ from proxy identifiers such as the DUNS number, NCAGE code, or the Legal Entity Identifier (LEI) managed by GLEIF. While proxy identifiers can be issued by institutions that do not create legal entities, ALEIs are created and maintained by public bodies with the authority to form and register legal entities.

This authoritative origin makes ALEIs particularly suitable for applications involving legal traceability, government regulation, and international transparency efforts.

== Usage ==
ALEIs are increasingly utilized to identify legal entities in public and private datasets. The identifiers support supply chain accuracy, regulatory compliance, and the unification of master data.

The first practical implementation of an ALEI was the International Business Registration Number (IBRN), developed to provide globally unique identifiers for registered business entities. IBRNs are issued by authorized government jurisdictions and are used to verify entities across borders, particularly in the context of trade facilitation and data exchange systems.

For instance, business directories and registration systems in U.S. states like Connecticut provide structured registration documents that can be used to verify the ALEIs they issue.

The use of ALEIs has been recommended by international organizations such as the Extractive Industries Transparency Initiative (EITI) and Open ownership to improve beneficial ownership registries.

== Policy and regulation ==
ALEIs have been referenced in policy consultations such as those related to the U.S. Financial Data Transparency Act. Federal institutions including the Federal Reserve and FDIC have examined the potential for ALEIs to unify entity identification across regulatory databases.

== See also ==
- Beneficial ownership
- Data quality
- International Business Registration Number (IBRN)
- ISO 8000
- Legal Entity Identifier (LEI)
- Master data
- Master data management
