= Paydex =

Paydex is a term used by Dun and Bradstreet, for a numerical score granted to businesses as a credit score for the promptness of their payments to creditors. The Paydex score is used for commercial organizations in a manner similar to the way the FICO score is used for individuals.

== Calculation ==
While credit scores for individuals or non-business entities take a number of factors into consideration, Paydex is calculated based on one single factor. Essentially, the factor is contingent upon whether the business makes payments to its respective suppliers and creditors either "as agreed" or "better than agreed" (i.e., pays prior to the agreed upon due date or pays more than the agreed upon amount; in other words, the payment exceeds the minimum balance).

== Interpretation ==
The Paydex Score ranges from 0 (worst) to 100 (best). A Paydex of 80 or higher is considered healthy for a company - that is, a company is paying its suppliers and vendors on time and before the scheduled payment due date. It is also important to note that payments received after they are due, or in other words, late, will negatively affect the organization's Paydex score. Today, most lenders and suppliers are looking for a score of 75 and higher.

== See also ==
- Data Universal Numbering System (D.U.N.S.)
