= Financial Instruments Reference Database System =

The ecosystem of the Financial Instrument Reference Database System (FIRDS)

The Financial Instruments Reference Database System (FIRDS) is published by the European Securities and Markets Authority (ESMA) and lists meta-information to all financial instruments included in the scope of Markets in Financial Instruments Directive 2004 (MiFID II). This reference data is necessary to find metadata on a given financial instrument, uniquely identified by a so-called International Securities Identification Number (ISIN).

== Regulation ==
The Article 4(1)(20) of Directive 2014/65/EU (MiFID II) considers "investment firms dealing on own account when executing client orders over the counter (OTC) on an organised, frequent, systematic and substantial basis" systematic internaliser and requires them to report their trades. From this data, ESMA computes on a best effort basis, the total volume and number of transactions executed within the EU.

== Technical details ==
According to the technical specification, new entries are published on a daily basis, every morning by 09:00 CET as XML-file. It contains the ISIN and the Market Identifier Code (MIC) as well as e.g. the Classification of Financial Instruments (CFI)-code and other information of the instrument.

The Legal Entity Identifier (LEI) code is conveyed by the ISSR. In the following example record in JSON format, the ISSR is represented by "Issr" : "851WYGNLUQLFZBSYGB56". This LEI code can be looked up using the website search. The LEI code corresponds to Commerzbank Aktiengesellschaft (Frankfurt) according to the LEI Registration Exception.

{
  "RefData": {
    "DebtInstrmAttrbts": {
      "NmnlValPerUnit": "2000",
      "IntrstRate": {
        "Fxd": "3.1415"
      },
      "MtrtyDt": "2020-01-01",
      "TtlIssdNmnlAmt": "200000000",
      "DebtSnrty": "SNDB"
    },
    "TradgVnRltdAttrbts": {
      "IssrReq": "false",
      "Id": "BMTF",
      "FrstTradDt": "2019-04-01T12:34:56.789"
    },
    "TechAttrbts": {
      "PblctnPrd": {
        "FrDt": "2019-04-04"
      },
      "RlvntCmptntAuthrty": "GB"
    },
    "FinInstrmGnlAttrbts": {
      "ClssfctnTp": "DBFNXX",
      "ShrtNm": "AVGO  3.625  10/16/24 c24 (URegS)",
      "FullNm": "AVGO 3  5/8  10/15/24 BOND",
      "NtnlCcy": "USD",
      "Id": "USU1109MAXXX",
      "CmmdtyDerivInd": "false"
    },
    "Issr": "851WYGNLUQLFZBSYGB56"
  }
}

== See also ==
- Request for quote
