= Transaction data =

Transaction data or transaction information is a category of data describing transactions. Transaction data/information gather variables generally referring to reference data or master data – e.g. dates, times, time zones, currencies.

Typical transactions are:

- Financial transactions about orders, invoices, payments;
- Work transactions about plans, activity records;
- Logistic transactions about deliveries, storage records, travel records, etc..

== Management ==
Recording and storing transactions is called records management. The record of the transaction is stored in a place where the retention can be guaranteed and where data is archived or removed following a retention period. Formats of recorded transactions can be digital data in databases and spreadsheets, or handwritten texts in physical documents like former bankbooks.

Transaction processing systems are application software that generate transactions and manage transaction data/information, e.g. SAP and Oracle Financials.

== Data warehousing ==
Transaction data can be summarised in a data warehouse, which helps accessibility and analysis of the data.

== See also ==
- Data modeling
- Data architecture
- Information lifecycle management, process of administering digital data storage and applying policies for effective information management
