= EORI number =

Identifier for businesses trading in the EU

An Economic Operators Registration and Identification number (EORI number) is a European Union registration and identification number for businesses which undertake the import or export of goods into or out of the EU.

Any business or individual established in the EU (an economic operator) needs to obtain an EORI number from their national customs authority before commencing customs activities in the EU. An economic operator established outside the EU needs to be assigned an EORI number if it intends to lodge a customs declaration, an Entry or an Exit Summary Declaration. Authorized economic operators in particular need to have an EORI number. EORI numbers can be validated online.

The EORI system was established in order to implement the security measures introduced by Regulation (EEC) No 2913/92, as amended by Regulation (EC) No 648/2005 of the European Parliament and of the Council. The European Commission notes that traders themselves have been calling for a common numbering system which is unique to each individual and valid throughout the European Union since mandatory identification codes for traders were introduced by Regulation 2286/20032. The commission's EORI2 project aims to update the existing system with additional elements required by the Union Customs Code Delegated Act, relating to whether the trader is established in the European Union or in a third country.

In certain cases, companies who move goods between Northern Ireland and Great Britain also require an EORI number.

== See also ==
- VAT identification number
- European Unique Identifier
