= International Business Registration Number =

- Acronym: IBRN
- Organisation: Electronic Commerce Code Management Association (ECCMA), International Organization for Standardization
- Introduced: 2019; 6 years ago
- No. of digits: Variable
- Check digit: None (depends on local registry format)
- Example: US-DE.BER:3031657
- Website: ealei.org

The International Business Registration Number (IBRN) is a globally unique identifier for legal entities, derived from their local registration number issued by government at time of origin combined with an international prefix. The term “IBRN” refers to an Authoritative Legal Entity Identifier (ALEI) formatted according to ISO 8000-116:2019, and is used to describe such identifiers in trade, regulatory, and interoperability contexts. It transforms the government issued domestic registration number into an internationally recognizable identifier by adding a standardized jurisdictional code. The structure and application of the IBRN are defined in the ISO 8000-116:2019 standard, which formalizes the use of an Authoritative Legal Entity Identifier (ALEI).

An IBRN addresses corporate digital identity in digital supply chain master data systems and enables business identifier interoperability in supply chain data. It is verifiable against the official company register that created and maintains the entity's legal existence, supporting initiatives such as Know Your Customer (KYC), Know Your Supplier (KYS), and anti-fraud compliance.

The IBRN differs from proxy identifiers such as the Legal Entity Identifier, D-U-N-S Number, or NCAGE code, or tax identifiers which are issued by private or delegated entities rather than the legal authorities that create the legal entities. These proxy identifiers lack the administrative authority to create or dissolve legal existence, unlike the authoritative origin of the IBRN.

== Format ==
An IBRN is composed of two parts: a prefix and the local authoritative registration number. The prefix contains the ISO 3166 country code, an optional subdivision code, and a register code. Together, these components specify the jurisdiction and authority under which the entity legally exists. The resulting format resembles:

<Country/Subdivision Registry Prefix>:<Local Registration Number>

The structure enables direct association with the entity's official registry, allowing third parties to identify the source of legal data such as formation date, registration status, and jurisdictional oversight.

== Function ==
The IBRN is designed to provide a persistent and verifiable reference to a legal entity's official record. It is particularly useful in supply chains, regulatory reporting, and due diligence processes. Each IBRN corresponds directly to an authoritative registry entry and can be used in both machine-readable and human-readable contexts.

IBRNs are considered authoritative because they utilize identifiers issued by official registries formatted in accordance with international data standards. They are globally unique by design, leveraging structured jurisdiction codes. The format is open and non-proprietary, allowing adoption without licensing fees. IBRNs can be implemented in software systems and databases for cross-border entity identification, and their transparency facilitates regulatory and compliance automation.

== Standardization and implementation ==
The IBRN format is specified in ISO 8000-116:2019. Terminology related to authoritative and proxy legal entity identifiers is defined in ISO 8000-2:2022. A related draft standard, ISO/CD 25500-1, outlines frameworks for interoperability in supply chain data verification and digital recordkeeping.

== Regulatory use ==
=== United States ===
The IBRN complies with section 124(c)(1)(A) of the U.S. Financial Stability Act of 2010, which mandates the use of a "common non-proprietary legal entity identifier". It has been proposed as a preferred identifier in responses to U.S. regulatory consultations on the Financial Data Transparency Act. Submissions from ECCMA and others have emphasized the non-proprietary nature of the identifier, noting that entities already possess the data necessary to construct an IBRN.

== Adoption ==
Following ISO publication in 2019, the IBRN has been incorporated into several digital trade initiatives and is promoted in supply chain contexts. The identifier has been discussed in documentation from international organizations including the World Trade Organization and International Chamber of Commerce, highlighting its role in improving business identity transparency across jurisdictions.

== See also ==
- Authoritative Legal Entity Identifier (ALEI)
- Company register
- D-U-N-S Number* Data quality
- Digital identity
- International Organization for Standardization (ISO)
- ISO 8000
- Legal Entity Identifier (LEI)
- Master data management
