= ISO/IEC 6523 =

International standard for identification of organisations

ISO/IEC 6523, Information technology – Structure for the identification of organizations and organization parts, is an international standard that defines a structure for uniquely identifying organizations and parts thereof in computer data interchange and specifies the registration procedure to obtain an International Code Designator (ICD) value for an identification scheme.

The standard consists of two parts:

Part 1: Identification of organization identification schemes defines a structure for the identification of organizations and parts thereof. The components of this structure are the following:

- an International Code Designator (ICD) that uniquely identifies the authority which issued the code to the organization, up to 4 digits
- an organization identifier, up to a maximum of 35 characters
- an (optional) organization part identifier (OPI), up to a maximum of 35 characters (an "organization part" can be any kind of entity within an organization.)
- an (optional) OPI source indicator, 1 digit, specifying who attributed the OPI

Part 2: Registration of organization identification schemes defines the registration procedure for ICD values. This includes:

- the requirements on the registration authority for ICD values.
- the specific procedures for the allocation and deletion of ICD values
- the contents of the register/list of the registered identification schemes

Farance Inc. serves as the Registration Authority for ISO/IEC 6523 on behalf of ISO/IEC.

Further information concerning ISO/IEC 6523 and how to obtain an ICD value can be found at iso6523.info. The page includes contact details for the Registration Authority and a list of allocated ICD values. A similar list is part of PEPPOL documentation.

ISO/IEC 6523 forms the basis of OSI naming under ISO/IEC 8348 OSI protocols. It also forms the 1.3 object identifier (OID) tree.

ICD allows registration of various identification schemes for organizations, locations (GS1 Global Location Number), goods (GS1 Global Trade Item Number), military organizations/activities (Department of Defense Activity Address Code), military suppliers (Commercial and Government Entity code), etc. It has been added to Schema.org as the property iso6523Code.

A widespread standard compliant with ISO 6523 norm is the identifier called "Global Location Number" (GLN), developed by GS1 company members. In B2B exchanges, it is widely used by companies to identify locations or functions within a location (for example a factory, the accounting department of a company, an administration, a warehouse, a delivery address, ...). It has become a key to exchange business messages (orders, invoices, ...) using UN/EDIFACT specifications.

The ebCore Party Id Type Technical Specification was issued by the Organization for the Advancement of Structured Information Standards (OASIS). It was elaborated by the OASIS ebXML Core Technical Committee and it specifies a Uniform Resource Name (URN) namespace for organization identifiers. It bases upon ISO/IEC 6523, ISO 9735 and ISO 20022.
