= Persistent data =

Information that is infrequently accessed and unlikely to be modified

Persistent data in the field of data processing denotes information that is infrequently accessed and unlikely to be modified.

Static data is information, for example a record, that does not change and may be intended to be permanent. It may have previously been categorized as persistent or dynamic.

Dynamic data (also known as transactional data) is information that is asynchronously updated as new information becomes available. Updates to dynamic data may come at any time, with periods of inactivity in between.

== See also ==
- Persistent data structure
- Persistent memory
- Phantom OS – persistent operation system implementing concept of persistent data
