= Percy L. Jones =

United States Army Medical Corps officer

- Born: Percy Lancelot Jones; May 26, 1875
- Died: August 9, 1941 (aged 66)
- Resting place: Arlington National Cemetery
- Occupation: Army Medical Corps officer

Colonel Percy Lancelot Jones (26 May 1875 – 9 August 1941) was an Army Medical Corps officer who served in the Spanish–American War and World War I, where he was instrumental in modernizing battlefield casualty evacuation. Jones was the commander of an ambulance service which served the French Army during World War I. In 1925, he headed a team assisting in the flood relief for Newton, Georgia and organised an anti-typhoid immunisation program. Three years later, following a hurricane in Florida, he was appointed sanitation adviser to West Palm Beach. On 1 August 1942, the Battle Creek Sanitarium, Michigan, was renamed the Percy L. Jones General Hospital for casualties of war.

Upon his death in 1941 he was buried in Arlington National Cemetery.
