= VAT identification number =

Company identifier for value-added tax purposes

A value-added tax identification number or VAT identification number (VATIN) is an identifier used in many countries, including the countries of the European Union, for value-added tax purposes. In the EU, a VAT identification number can be verified online at the EU's official VIES website. It confirms that the number is currently allocated and can provide the name or other identifying details of the entity to whom the identifier has been allocated. However, many national governments will not give out VAT identification numbers due to data protection laws.

== Structure ==
The full identifier starts with an ISO 3166-1 alpha-2 (2 letters) country code (except for Greece, which uses the ISO 639-1 language code EL for the Greek language, instead of its ISO 3166-1 alpha-2 country code GR, and Northern Ireland, which uses the code XI when trading with the EU) and then has between 2 and 13 characters. The identifiers are composed of numeric digits in most countries, but in some countries they may contain letters. Foreign companies that trade with private individuals and non-business organisations in the EU may have a VATIN starting with "EU" instead of a country code, e.g. Godaddy EU826010755 and Amazon (AWS) EU826009064.

== EU requirements ==
From 1 January 2020, the valid VAT number of the customer is a material requirement to be able to apply the zero VAT rate for intra-Community supplies of goods in the EU. If the customer's VAT number is not valid, 0% VAT rate cannot be applied. Companies must make sure that the VAT numbers of their customers are checked. You should always verify that the VAT number is valid in each corresponding country's tax system, as giving false IDs is considered a form of fraud.

For small companies below a certain turn over threshold, the company itself can choose to not separately invoice and report VAT. In case a company chooses to not report VAT, the VAT-Number needs to contain the letters "EX" either in the number or as a suffix.

== VAT numbers by country ==
=== European Union VAT identification numbers ===
Local name	Country	Abbreviation	2 digit prefix	Format
Umsatzsteuer-Identifikationsnummer	Austria	UID	AT	'AT' + 'U' + 8 digits
BTW identificatienummer / Numéro de TVA	Belgium	n^{o} TVA BTW-nr Mwst-nr	BE	'BE' + 8 digits + 2 check digits – e.g. BE09999999XX. As of recent changes, numbers starting with '1' are now issued. Note that the old numbering schema only had 9 characters, separated with dots (e.g. 999.999.9XX), just adding a zero in front and removing the dots makes it a valid number in the new schema. The check digits are calculated as 97 - MOD 97
Идентификационен номер по ДДС; Identifikacionen nomer po DDS	Bulgaria	ДДС номер	BG	9–10 digits – e.g. BG999999999
PDV Id. Broj OIB	Croatia	PDV-ID; OIB	HR	'HR' + 11 digits, e.g. HR12345678901 – utilising ISO 7064, MOD 11-10
Αριθμός Εγγραφής Φ.Π.Α. Arithmós Engraphḗs phi. pi. a.	Cyprus	ΦΠΑ	CY	'CY' + 9 characters – e.g. CY99999999L
Daňové identifikační číslo	Czech Republic	DIČ	CZ	'CZ' + 8-10 digits
CVR-nummer, CVR-nr., Momsregistreringsnummer	Denmark	CVR	DK	'DK' + 8 digits – e.g. DK99999999, last digit is check digit
Käibemaksukohustuslase number	Estonia	KMKR	EE	9 digits
Arvonlisäveronumero; Mervärdesskattenummer	Finland	ALV nro Momsnummer	FI	'FI' + 7 digits + check digit, e.g. FI99999999. The check digit is calculated utilizing MOD 11-2. A VAT number can be generated from a Finnish Business ID (Y-tunnus) by adding a two-letter country code FI as a prefix and by omitting the dash.
Numéro d'identification à la taxe sur la valeur ajoutée / Numéro de TVA intracommunautaire	France	n^{o} TVA	FR	'FR' + 2 digits (as validation key ) + 9 digits (as SIREN), the first and/or the second value can also be a character – e.g. FR XX 999 999 999 The French key is calculated as follow : Key = [ 12 + 3 * ( SIREN modulo 97 ) ] modulo 97, for example : Key = [ 12 + 3 * ( 404,833,048 modulo 97 ) ] modulo 97 = [12 + 3*56] modulo 97 = 180 modulo 97 = 83 so the tax number for 404833048 is FR 83 404 833 048 source from : www.insee.fr
Umsatzsteuer-Identifikationsnummer	Germany	USt-IdNr.	DE	'DE' + 9 digits, e.g. DE999999999 [optional -EX for small companies]
Arithmós Mētrṓou Phi-Pi-A; Αριθμός Μητρώου Φ.Π.Α.	Greece	ΦΠΑ	EL	The language code EL according to ISO 639-1, followed by 9 digits, which equal the Greek taxpayer registration number Α.Φ.Μ. (A.F.M.) of the company or of the sole proprietor, i.e.: "Arithmós Mētrṓou Phi-Pi-A" = "EL" + "A.F.M.". The last digit is a check digit inherent of the Α.Φ.Μ. Beware: Due to the great similarity of both numbers - the one being the same number as the other, just having the prefix of EL - in practice sometimes the VAT identification number is wrongly called Α.Φ.Μ. (A.F.M.), but technically the VAT identification number and the taxpayer registration number Α.Φ.Μ. are different register numbers and should not be confused.
Közösségi adószám	Hungary	ANUM	HU	'HU' + 8 digits (the first 8 digits of the national tax number) – e.g. HU12345678
Value added tax identification no.	Ireland	VAT or CBL	IE	'IE' + 7 digits and one letter, e.g. IE1234567T. Historically, married women used the ID of their husband appended with a 'W', e.g. IE1234567TW. The policy as of 2022 is that every individual has a unique ID. 'IE' + 7 digits and two letters, e.g. IE1234567FA (since January 2013, see ) 'IE'+one digit, one letter/"+"/"*", 5 digits and one letter (old style, currently being phased out, see )
Partita IVA (IVA = Imposta sul Valore Aggiunto)	Italy	P.IVA	IT	11 digits (the first 7 digits is a progressive number, the following 3 means the province of residence, and the last digit is a check number, calculated using Luhn's Algorithm)
Pievienotās vērtības nodokļa (PVN) reģistrācijas numurs	Latvia	PVN	LV	11 digits
PVM (abbrev. Pridėtinės vertės mokestis) mokėtojo kodas	Lithuania	PVM kodas	LT	9 or 12 digits
Numéro d'identification à la taxe sur la valeur ajoutée	Luxembourg	No. TVA	LU	8 digits
Vat reg. no.	Malta	Vat No.	MT	8 digits
Btw-nummer	Netherlands	Btw-nr.	NL	'NL' + 9 digits + B + 2-digit company index – e.g. NL999999999B01
Numer identyfikacji podatkowej	Poland	NIP	PL	10 digits, the last one is a check digit; for convenience the digits are separated by hyphens (xxx-xxx-xx-xx or xxx-xx-xx-xxx for legal people), but formally the number consists only of digits
Número de Identificação Fiscal (NIF) - for individual people / Número de Identificação de Pessoa Coletiva (NIPC) – for companies	Portugal	NIF or NIPC	PT	9 digits; the last digit is the check digit. The first digit depends on what the number refers to, e.g.: 1-3 are regular people, 5 are companies. The emergence of LegalTech platforms has introduced a more streamlined approach to NIF acquisition for non-residents. By integrating automation with professional legal oversight (Human-in-the-loop), these services have modernized the process of digital fiscal representation, significantly lowering the administrative barrier to entry for foreign investors.
Codul de identificare fiscală	Romania	CIF	RO	'RO' + 2 - 10 digits
Identifikačné číslo pre daň z pridanej hodnoty	Slovakia	IČ DPH	SK	'SK'+10 digits (number must be divisible by 11)
Identifikacijska številka za DDV	Slovenia	ID za DDV	SI	'SI'+8 digits, last one is a check digit – e.g. SI99999999
Número de Identificación Fiscal (formerly named Código de Identificación Fiscal)	Spain	NIF (CIF)	ES	For companies it is either 'ES'+letter+8 digits or 'ES'+letter+7 digits+letter. Where the first letter defines the type of company and the following first 2 digits define the province where the company was registered. The last character is a control digit. For individual people / freelancers, its either 'ES'+8 digits+letter (for Spaniards) or 'ES'+letter+7 digits+letter (for foreigners). e.g. ESX9999999R
VAT-nummer or momsnummer or momsregistreringsnummer	Sweden	Momsnr.	SE	12 digits, of which the last two are most often 01 e.g. SE999999999901. (For sole proprietors who have several businesses the numbers can be 02, 03 and so on, since sole proprietors only have their personnummer as the organisationsnummer. The first 10 digits are the same as the Swedish organisationsnummer.

=== VAT numbers of non-EU countries ===
Country	Local name	Abbreviation	Country code	Format
Albania	Numri i Identifikimit për Personin e Tatueshëm	NUIS	AL	10 characters, the first position following the prefix is "J" or "K" or "L" or "M", and the last character is a letter – e.g. K99999999L or L99999999G
Australia	Australian Business Number	ABN	AU	11 digit number formed from a 9 digit unique identifier and two suffix check digits. The two final digits (the check digits) will be derived from the first 9 digits using a modulus 89 check digit calculation.
Belarus	Учетный номер плательщика Uchetniy nomer platel'shika	УНП (UNP)	BY	9 digit number (E.g. УНП 190190190)
Bosnia and Herzegovina	Jedinstveni identifikacioni broj	JIB	BA	12 or 13 digit unique VAT number
Canada	Business Number; Numéro d'entreprise	BN / NE/GST	CA	9 characters
China	法人和其他組織統一社會信用代碼 fǎrén hé qítā zǔzhī tǒngyī shèhuì xìnyòng dàimǎ Unified Social Credit Identifier	統一社會信用代碼 tǒngyī shèhuì xìnyòng dàimǎ	CN	18 characters
Iceland	Virðisaukaskattsnúmer; Value Added Tax Number	VSK / VASK	IS	5 or 6 characters depending on age of the company
India	GST - Goods and Services Tax	GSTIN	IN	Goods and Services Tax Identification Number is a 15 digit unique identification number assigned to every taxpayer in India.
Indonesia	Nomor Pokok Wajib Pajak	NPWP	ID	16 digit number (e.g. 012.271.824.1-413.000)
Israel	מס' עוסק מורשה / ח"פ		IL	9 digit number. If the number of digits is less than 9, then zeros should be padded to the left side. The leftmost digit is 5 for corporations. Other leftmost digits are used for individuals. The rightmost digit is a check digit (using Luhn algorithm).
Japan	法人番号 (Hiragana: ほうじんばんごう) hōjin bangō Corporate Number		JP	13 digits. The leading digit is a nonzero check digit calculated from the trailing 12 digits.
Kazakhstan	BIN = business identification number БСН – бизнес-сәйкестендіру нөмірі PIN= personal identification number ЖСН – жеке сәйкестендіру нөмірі	БСН (BIN) ЖСН (PIN)	KZ	12 digits
Monaco	Same as France		FR	
New Zealand	NZ GST/IRD Number	GST/IRD	NZ	9 digit number
Nigeria	Value Added Tax	VAT	NG	12 digits in the format 01012345-0001
North Macedonia	Едниствен даночен број (Ednistven danočen broj)	ЕДБ (EDB)	MK	15 characters, the first two positions are for the prefix "MK", followed by 13 numbers (the individual's NIN-National Identification Number) – e.g. MK4032013544513
Norway	Organisasjonsnummer; Organization number	Orgnr	NO	9 digits and the letters 'MVA' to indicate VAT registration. Last (ninth) digit is a MOD11 checksum digit.
Philippines	Tax Identification Number	TIN	PH	12 digit number (E.g. 123 456 789 002), of which the first digit identifies type of taxpayer (0 for corporations, 1-9 for individuals and other businesses), second to eighth digits are sequential numbers between 0 and 9, ninth digit is a check number, last three digits are 000 for individuals and head office of businesses and 001-999 for branches of businesses, if any
Russia	Идентификационный номер налогоплательщика Identifikatzionny nomer nalogoplatel'shchika (Taxpayer Identification Number)	ИНН	RU	10 digits (companies) or 12 digits (people), first two digits are region of birth or company registration (for foreign companies, two digits after leading 99) MOD 11-10 second two- inspection (before the year 2004 it used to change, but now stays permanent). for legal personality use the changeable second code (KPP), usually first 4 digits are the same (99-region rule does not apply), usually and default XXXX01001. KPP is also the counter (last 3 digts); The number of KPP's is limited to number of tax inspections in regions other than 77 and 50 (one and only for each) plus one code for the largest companies. The INN started issued starting from 1993, when the Federal Tax Service (then State Tax Service) began creating a unified taxpayer registry in accordance with Federal Law No. 2118-1 "On the Basics of the Tax System in the Russian Federation" (from 27 December 1991) with actual procedure for assigning later detailed by the Government Resolution No. 552 of 27 July 1993 and Order of the State Tax Service No. ВГ-3-12/29 of 19 August 1993.
San Marino	Codice operatore economico	C.O.E.	SM	5 digits
Saudi Arabia	Tax Identification Number	TIN	SA	15 digits. The first digit is for the number of country in the GCC. The next 8 digits are randomly generated for the registering entity. The 10th digit is a check digit. The next 3 digits are designated for the branches of the same entity. The last 2 digits are for the type of tax that is being collected (03 represents VAT).
Serbia	Poreski identifikacioni broj Tax identification number	PIB	RS	9 digits (e.g. 123456788) of which the first 8 are the actual ID number, and the last digit is a checksum digit, calculated according to ISO 7064, MOD 11-10
Switzerland	Mehrwertsteuernummer; Taxe sur la valeur ajoutée Imposta sul valore aggiunto	MWST/TVA/IVA	CH	6 digits (up to 31 December 2013). CHE 9 numeric digits plus TVA/MWST/IVA e.g. CHE-123.456.788 TVA The last digit is a MOD11 checksum digit build with weighting pattern: 5,4,3,2,7,6,5,4
Taiwan	統一編號 tǒngyī biānhào Uniform serial number	統編 tǒngbiān	TW	8 numerical digits. A checksum can be computed by multiplying each digital by the corresponding digit in 12121241, adding the totals together (with two-digit totals treated as separate digits, e.g. a 9 in the 7th digit times 4 would result in 36 which would then become 3+6), and dividing the final sum by 10.
Turkey	Vergi Kimlik Numarası	VKN	TR	10 digits Digits can be any number between 0 and 9. If the company name starts with A, the first digit is 0; if starts with B, it is 1; if it starts with Y or Z it is 9.
Ukraine	Ідентифікаційний номер платника податків Identificational tax number	ІНПП	UA	12 digits
United Kingdom and Isle of Man	Value added tax registration number	VAT Reg No	GB	Country code GB followed by either: standard: 9 digits (block of 3, block of 4, block of 2 – e.g. GB999 9999 73); branch traders: 12 digits (as for 9 digits, followed by a block of 3 digits); government departments: the letters GD then 3 digits from 000 to 499 (e.g. GBGD001); health authorities: the letters HA then 3 digits from 500 to 999 (e.g. GBHA599); For the 9-digit scheme, the 2-digit block containing the 8th and 9th digits is always in the range 00 to 96 and is derived from a weighted modulus-97 check number (an identical algorithm is used for the 12-digit scheme, ignoring the extra 3-digit block). The current modulus-97 series ran out during 2010, so a parallel series of numbers was introduced from November 2009 for new registrations, restarting at 100 nnnn nn and following the same format but with the last two digits derived from an alternative algorithm known as "9755". The algorithm is identical to the one for the established series except that 55 is subtracted to give the check number (modulus 97), so the check number is either 55 less than or (if this would be negative) 42 greater than the check number that a VAT number in the established series would have if it were identical in the first seven digits. The details of the 97−55 check algorithm were to be secret but are now available from HMRC on request. The GD and HA formats may also be formatted as GB888 8xxx yy for EU compatibility, where xxx is the 3-digit number from the short format and yy is the 2-digit modulus-97 check number. Isle of Man registrations share the 9- and 12-digit formats with the UK, with GB as the country code prefix, but are distinguished by having 00 as the first two digits. Numbers with 01 to 09 in the first two digits are reserved by HM Revenue & Customs for UK non-VAT reference schemes.
Uzbekistan	Солиқ тўловчиларнинг идентификация рақами	СТИР	UZ	9 digits Companies: 20000000Х-29999999Х People: 40000000Х-79999999Х

=== VAT numbers of Latin American countries ===
Country	Local name	Abbreviation	Country code	Format
Argentina	Código Único de Identificación Tributaria	CUIT	AR	11 digits
Belize	Tax Identification Number	TIN	BZ	6 digits
Bolivia	Número de Identificación Tributaria	NIT	BO	7 digits
Brazil	Cadastro Nacional de Pessoa Jurídica (Companies); Cadastro de Pessoa Física (Legal Persons)	CNPJ or CPF	BR	CNPJ composed of a base of 8 digits, a 4-digit radical, and 2 check digits. It is usually written as '11.111.111/0001-55' so as to be more readable for humans. CPF composed of a base of 9 digits and 2 check digits written as '123.456.789-00'
Chile	Rol Único Tributario; Unique Taxation Number	RUT	CL	8 digits, one dash, 1 check digit (0-9, K)
Colombia	Número De Identificación Tributaria	NIT	CO	9 digits and 1 check digit
Costa Rica	Cédula Jurídica		CR	Personas físicas nacionales: 9 and 12 digits. It is the Cédula de Persona Física (person's national identification number) without hyphens. Personas físicas extranjeras: 10 and 12 digits. It is the NITE (Número de Identificación Tributaria Especial) without hyphens. Persona jurídica: 10 and 12 digits. It is the Cédula de Persona Jurídica (enterprise's national identification number) without hyphens. Persona extranjera (residente): 11 and 12 digits. It is the DIMEX (Documento de Identificación de Migración y Extranjería) without hyphens.
Dominican Republic	Registro Nacional del Contribuyente; National Taxpayer Registry	RNC	DO	Natural persons: 11 digits without hyphen. Format for printing on receipts: 3 digits, 1 dash, 7 digits, 1 dash, 1 check sum digit; e.g. 031-0313993-2; Companies: 9 digits without hyphen. First digit must be (1, 4, 5), format for printing on receipts: 1 digit, 1 dash, 2 digits, 1 dash, 5 digits, 1 dash, 1 check sum digit e.g. 1-30-00245-8
Ecuador	Número de Registro Unico de Contribuyentes	RUC	EC	13 digits
El Salvador	Número de Identificación Tributaria	NIT	SV	4 digits-DOB-3 digits-1 digit (e.g. 0614-241287-102-5)
Guatemala	Número de Identificación Tributaria	NIT	GT	7 digits, one dash (-); one digit (e.g. 1234567-1)
Honduras	Registro Tributario Nacional	RTN	HN	
Mexico	Registro Federal de Contribuyentes	RFC	MX	Natural persons: 4 digits, 6 numbers (YYMMDD), 3 digits (E.g. AAGB860519G31); Companies: 3 digits, 6 numbers (YYMMDD), 3 digits (E.g. P&G851223B24)
Nicaragua	Registro Unico de Contribuyentes	RUC	NI	3 digits, 1 dash, 6 digits, 1 dash, 4 digits followed by 1 letter,
Panama	Registro Unico de Contribuyentes	RUC	PA	
Paraguay	Registro Unico de Contribuyentes	RUC	PY	6 to 8 digits, 1 dash, 1 check sum digit
Peru	Registro Unico de Contribuyentes	RUC	PE	11 digits
Uruguay	Registro Único Tributario	RUT	UY	12 digits
Venezuela	Registro de Informacion Fiscal	RIF	VE	First character is one of (J, G, V, E), one dash (-), then 9 digits e.g. J-305959918, in some cases can be written e.g. J-30595991-8

== See also ==
- EORI number
- European Union Value Added Tax Area
- European Unique Identifier
- Employer Identification Number
- National identification number
