= ACASS =

ACASS, or Architect-Engineer Contract Administration Support System, was developed in 1975, in response to The 1972 Brooks Architect-Engineer Act, Public Law 92–582 (see external link below). The Brooks Act requires the public announcement of requirements for A–E services by Federal agencies (with some exceptions provided by other statutes); selection of the most highly qualified firms based on demonstrated competence and professional qualifications; and the negotiation of a fair and reasonable price, starting with the highest qualified firm. Hence, the selection of A–E contractors is focused on qualifications, and not the lowest price. ACASS supports procedures defined in Part 36 of the Federal Acquisition Regulations (FAR).

As envisioned, ACASS collected and distributed information used by Federal Government Selection committees in the process of awarding A–E contracts. This information included the SF 330 part II A-E Qualifications Statement submitted by A-E firms to the Online Representations and Certifications Application (ORCA), limited DoD Contract Award information, and A-E Performance Evaluations. Evaluations were retained in the ACASS system for six years from the date signed by the Rating/Evaluating Official.

The ACASS number was abolished when the ACASS system transitioned to a modernized platform on October 5, 2005. The ACASS system now uses the D.U.N.S. number, in place of an ACASS number. Firms should supply their DUNS number, and notify the requestor of the discontinuation of the ACASS number, when asked for their ACASS number.
