= Hart–Dole–Inouye Federal Center =

- U.S. National Register of Historic Places
- Michigan State Historic Site
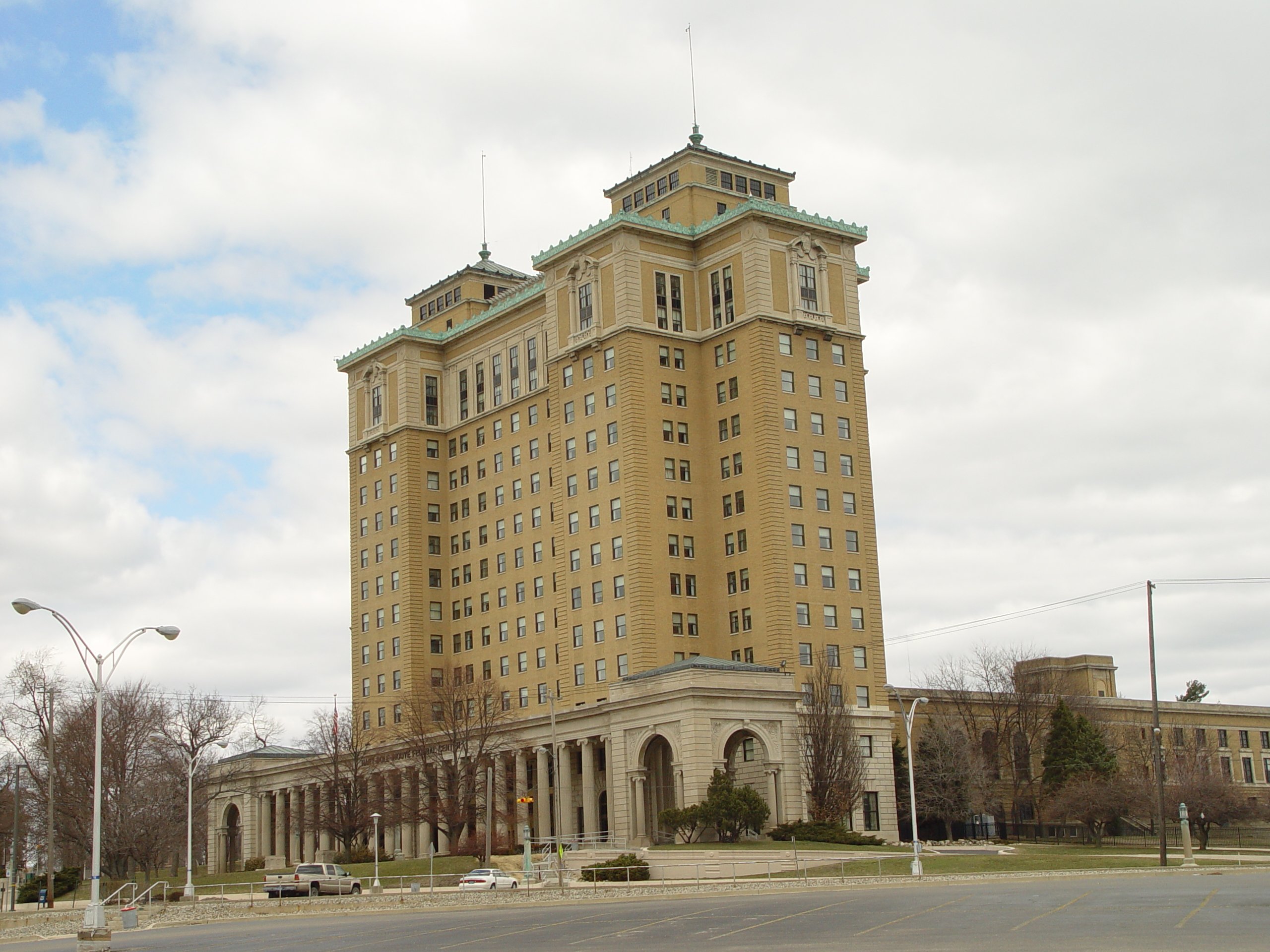

- Location within Michigan Location within the United States
- Interactive map showing the location of Hart-Dole-Inouye Federal Center
- Location: 74 North Washington Street; Battle Creek, Michigan
- Coordinates: 42°19′37″N 85°11′16″W
- Built: 1903
- Architect: Frank Mills Andrews; Merritt Morehouse
- Architectural style: Italian Renaissance Revival
- NRHP reference No.: 74000980 (original); 11001060 (increase)

Significant dates
- Added to NRHP: July 30, 1974
- Boundary increase: January 27, 2012
- Designated MSHS: September 7, 1989

The Hart–Dole–Inouye Federal Center, formerly the Battle Creek Federal Center, is a complex of federal buildings located in Battle Creek, Michigan.

== History ==
The facility has a colorful history intertwined with notable Americans. The property successively served as a sanitarium, military hospital, and offices. The center consists of 22 buildings on 24 acres, all of which were added to the National Register of Historic Places on January 27, 2012.

The Hart–Dole–Inouye Federal Center is among one hundred properties featured in the General Service Administration's Public Buildings Heritage Program.

=== Western Health Reform Institute ===
In 1866, the Seventh-day Adventists established the Western Health Reform Institute on eight acres of land, the former residence of Benjamin Graves, a judge of the Michigan Superior Court. H. S. Lay, the first physician in charge, and James and Ellen White, early founders of the Seventh-day Adventist Church, were instrumental in founding this health institution. The goals of the institution were to teach the Adventists' version of holistic medicine, which stressed the importance of temperance and preventive medicine, taking in visitors and advocating the use of Graham bread and counseling eight hours of sleep at night. From this farmhouse the institution struggled to live up to its name but there were ideas and propositions for a building that would lead to a worldwide reputation.

=== Battle Creek Sanitarium ===
In 1876, Dr. John Harvey Kellogg, medical director, renamed the property and expanded the facility to include a hospital, central building, and other cottages. Much of the original sanitarium burned down in 1902. A large building by architect Frank Mills Andrews opened in 1903 at a cost of $1 million and was considered a marvel of modern planning and medical technology. Under Kellogg's auspices, the sanitarium expanded, and a tower addition was completed in 1928. The tide turned, however, in 1929 when the economy collapsed and the nation entered into the depression. Within four years, the sanitarium had gone into receivership.

=== Percy Jones Army Hospital ===
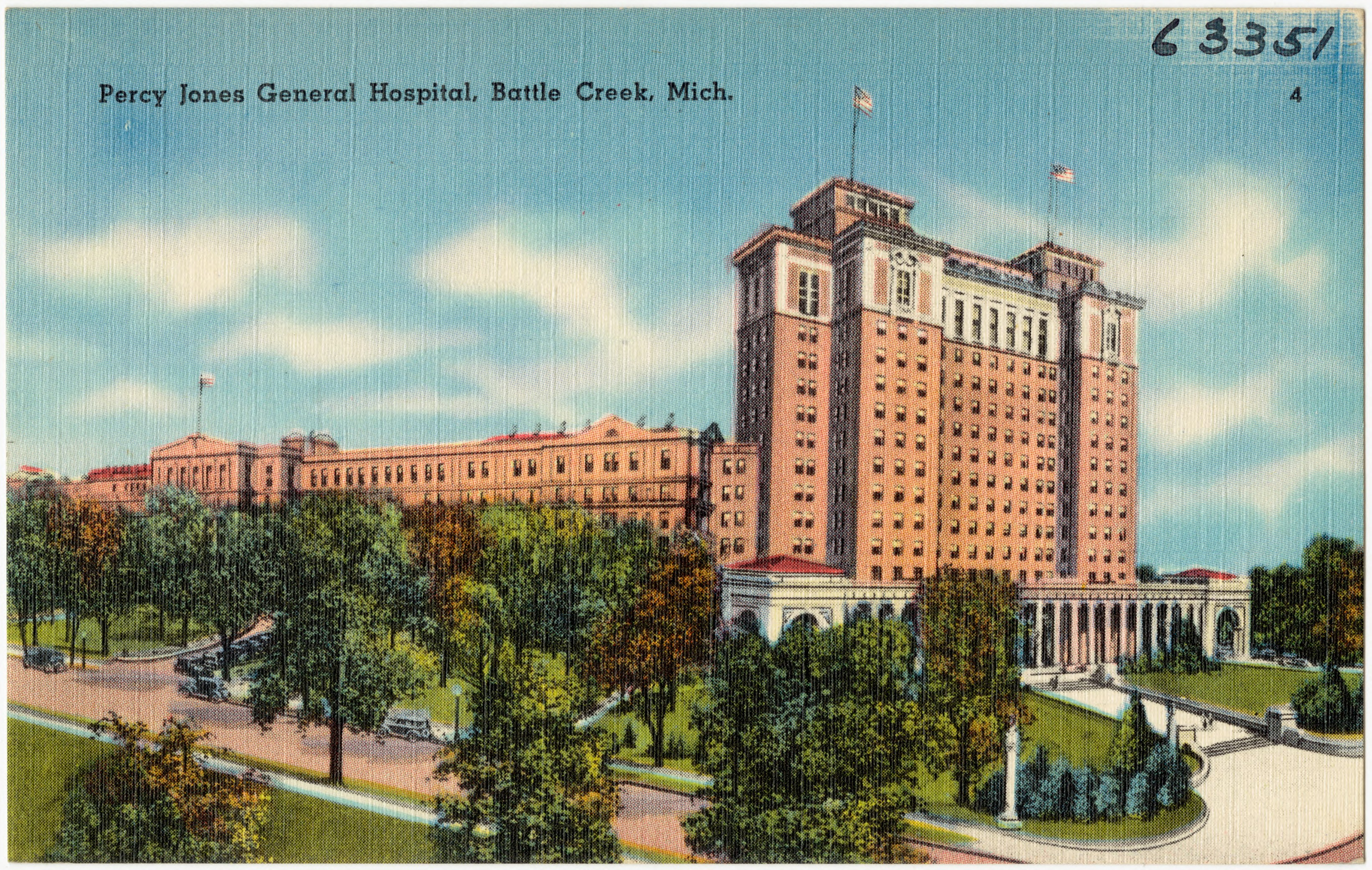
Postcard from hospital era

With the outbreak of World War II, local builder Floyd Skidmore proposed that the near-vacant sanitarium be converted into a military hospital. Upon this recommendation, in August 1942, the United States Army bought the buildings for $2.25 million and FJ Skidmore & Son rebuilt the derelict structure in six months (working around the clock), enlarging the capacity of the hospital from 1,000 beds to 1,500, and constructing rails and ramps throughout the facility.

On February 22, 1943, the hospital was officially dedicated by its first commander, Colonel Norman T. Kirk. He was the former chief of surgical services at Walter Reed General Hospital in Washington, D.C. The new hospital was named after Colonel Percy L. Jones, US Army, a pioneering military surgeon who developed modern battlefield ambulance evacuation.

The hospital grew as the flow of casualties increased. In 1944, W.K. Kellogg donated his mansion on nearby Gull Lake to the Army, which assigned it to Percy Jones as a convalescent center. The Fort Custer Reception Center was also used by Percy Jones for patients on "casual duty". The Percy Jones hospital complex was massive, self-contained, and fully integrated. It had its own water supply and power generation. It also had its own bank, post office, public library and radio station "KPJ". The Percy Jones Institute was an accredited high school, with dozens of educational and training programs for patients ranging from photography to business to agriculture.

At the height of the war, more than two thousand people visited the hospital on a daily basis, including celebrities such as Bob Hope, Jimmy Stewart, Ed Sullivan, Gene Autry, and Roy Rogers.

In 1945, Percy Jones became the largest medical installation of any kind in the world. Following V-J Day (victory over Japan) in 1945, the hospital population peaked with 11,427 patients assigned to its three area sites. Percy Jones specialized as an Army center for neurosurgery, amputations and handicapped rehabilitation, deep x-ray therapy and plastic artificial eyes. In one month alone, 729 operations were performed.

After a short deactivation period, the hospital reopened only a few days after hostilities broke out in Korea in the summer of 1950. In 1951, about 1,000 patients were at Percy Jones, many of them with frostbite caused by the bone-chilling Korean weather. In 1954, after treating more than 100,000 patients, the Percy Jones Hospital was permanently closed and the building was placed under the control of the General Services Administration.

In the decade it was open, the hospital made a lasting impact on the city. Battle Creek was the first city in America to install wheelchair ramps in its sidewalks, to accommodate the Percy Jones patients when they visited downtown.

=== Battle Creek Federal Center ===
In 1954, the GSA moved the National Federal Civil Defense Administration (from Washington D.C.) and the Staff College of the National Civil Defense Training Agency (from Olney, Maryland) to the retired hospital in Battle Creek. The facility was again rebuilt to prepare it for atomic attack. The civil defense operations at the facility included coordinating government and private technical services, volunteer and shelter deployment, public education, and emergency communications. In recognition of the facility's new purpose, the building was renamed the Battle Creek Federal Center.

Five years later, in 1959, the GSA began using facility space for other federal organizations, and by 1962, twenty-eight different agencies were housed there. The Office for Civil Defense was moved from the Battle Creek Federal Center in late 1962 and the Sixth Corps of the U.S. Fifth Army and Defense Logistics Services Center (DLSC) were transferred in.

Currently, the Defense Logistics Agency (Defense Logistics Information Service (DLIS) and Systems Integration Office (DSIO-J)) remains as the principal tenant of the Hart–Dole–Inouye Federal Center, along with the DLA Disposition Services, and the Air Force Cataloging and Standardization Center (CASC).

=== Hart–Dole–Inouye Federal Center ===
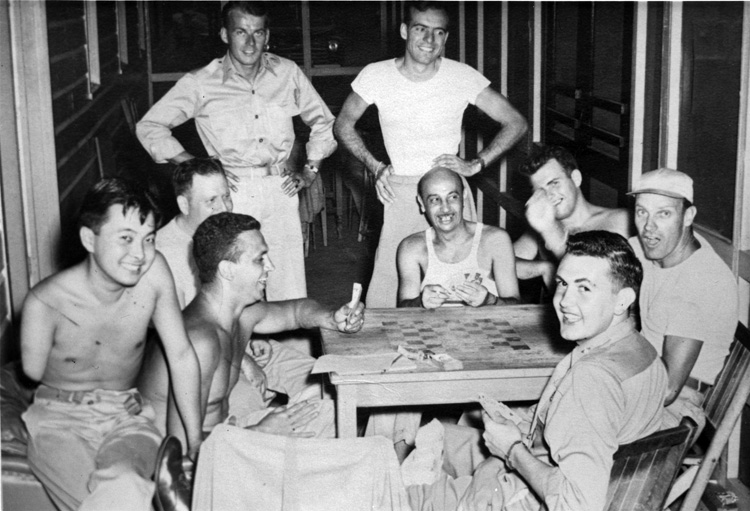
Two of the building's namesakes, Daniel Inouye (left) and Bob Dole (next to Inouye) playing cards while recovering at Percy Jones Army Hospital in the mid-1940s.

In 2003, the building was re-dedicated as the Hart–Dole–Inouye Federal Center in honor of three U.S. senators who had met as wounded servicemen while they were being treated at the hospital during WWII: Philip Hart of Michigan, who had been wounded during the Normandy Landings at Utah Beach on D-Day, Bob Dole of Kansas, who was wounded in combat over Italy, and Daniel Inouye of Hawaii, who had been wounded while engaged in combat in Italy.

== Architecture ==
The Center includes 21 buildings on 24 acres. Building types include offices, a power plant, workshops, and storage buildings. The main 1903 sanitarium building has a rectangular footprint with three wings radiating out from the main block. It is now referred to as Building 2, with the wings designated as Buildings 2A, 2B, and 2C. It is designed in the Italian Renaissance Revival style, which was commonly used for academic buildings in the early twentieth century. This was a logical choice for the sanitarium since Kellogg sought to educate his patients in the ways of healthy living.

The facade is composed of buff-colored brick with decorative details such as piers, belt courses, and quoins (corner blocks) executed in gray brick. Decorative pediments (triangular gables) are above entrances. Concrete columns mark the main entrance bay and are topped with plaster Ionic (scrolled) capitals. Arched openings form loggias, which are roofed spaces with open sides. The monumental building occupies a high point in the city and was originally five stories in height, with a compatibly designed sixth story added in 1920. Despite the changes in use, the building's exterior has not been altered substantially.

The first-floor lobby has an ornate plaster ceiling. The east wall of the lobby contains a tripartite leadedglass window; the center portion bears the inscription "He is Thy Life." The stairway to the mezzanine has a cast-iron balustrade with a wood railing and marble steps. The newel post contains classically inspired ornamentation appropriate to the building style.

The sixth-floor lobby contains four murals painted by J. J. Haidt in 1922. They are located on the coved ceiling and depict serene landscape scenes in pastel colors. Other interior spaces have changed dramatically. The solarium, gymnasium, and swimming pool have been demolished.

The most prominent feature of the complex is the 15-story tower that was added to the south side of Building 2 in 1928. The tower, currently designated as Building 1, was designed to complement the existing main sanitarium building. The exterior remains unchanged and is clad in stone and different shades of brick. The facade is dominated by a two-story colonnade with 32 Ionic columns. Porte cochere pavilions are located at each end of the colonnade. The tower originally contained more than 265 hotel-like guest rooms and suites, most of which had private bathrooms. These spaces have been altered to accommodate government offices. The luxurious two-story lobby of the tower has twelve massive marble columns with imported Italian marble bases. The columns are topped with Corinthian capitals that feature acanthus leaf designs. The ceiling in the lobby is coffered (recessed) and detailed with floral motifs executed in rich colors. The lobby walls are covered with pink-gold marble, and gold chandeliers illuminate the space. Tall windows open to the colonnade. Building 1A was originally the sanitarium's lavish dining room. It retains many original features including large chandeliers and murals of Oriental scenes. Draperies, doors, and decorative moldings have been restored. The room retains much of its original character and serves as a cafeteria today.

== Significant events ==
- 1866: Western Health Reform Institute opens
- 1902: Fire destroys earliest buildings
- 1903: New five-story building completed
- 1920: Sixth story added to main building
- 1928: Tower completed
- 1942: U.S. Army purchases site for use as hospital
- 1954: Federal Civil Defense Administration moves into complex
- 1974: Buildings 2, 2A, 2B, and 2C listed in the National Register of Historic Places
- 1996: Interior renovation completed
- 2003: Complex renamed Hart–Dole–Inouye Federal Center

== Building facts ==
- Location: 74 North Washington Street
- Architects: Frank M. Andrews; Merritt Morehouse
- Construction Dates: 1902-1903; 1920; 1928
- Landmark Status: Buildings 2, 2A, 2B, and 2C listed in the National Register of Historic Places; Buildings 1 and 1A eligible for listing in the National Register of Historic Places
- Architectural Style: Italian Renaissance Revival
- Primary Material: Buff-Colored Brick
- Prominent Features: 15-Story Tower Ionic Colonnade

== See also ==
- List of former United States Army medical units
