= Commercial and Government Entity code =

Component of the NATO Codification System

The Commercial and Government Entity Code, or CAGE Code, is a unique identifier assigned to suppliers to various government or defense agencies, as well as to government agencies themselves and various organizations. CAGE codes provide a standardized method of identifying a given facility at a specific location.

CAGE Codes are used internationally as part of the NATO Codification System (NCS), where they are sometimes called NCAGE Codes. CAGE codes are referenced in various databases of the NCS, where they are used along with the supplier's part number to form a reference which is held on the National Stock Number (NSN) record. This reference enables users of the NCS to determine who supplies any given part.

The information associated with the entities - name, address, phone numbers, etc. - is catalogued in the H4 and H8 Handbooks. The National Codification Bureau (NCB) of each NATO or NATO-sponsored Nation is responsible for maintaining the CAGE code information for entities in these respective countries.

Within the US, any organization wishing to be a supplier to the DoD is issued a CAGE Code by Defense Logistics Information Service (DLIS), the organization serving as the US NCB. An entity issued a CAGE code must renew it every five years.

CAGE is sometimes expanded as "Commercial Activity/Government Entity", "Contractor And Government Entity", or other, similar variations.

In the NCS metadata, the CAGE code's Data Record Number (DRN) is 9250 (or 4140 for NSCM); information listed under this DRN identifies very specifically the semantics of CAGE, its syntax, and the procedures associated with it.

== Syntax ==
CAGE codes are all five characters in length. There is no meaning encoded in the code itself, other than the underlying NCB; it is simply a unique identifier. The Code Chart provided by the NATO AC/135 committee (the group of National Directors on Codification) provides the syntax of CAGE codes in various countries.

Country	Code	Membership	Starts With	Ends With
NATO			I or S or X	#
Albania	AL	Member	A	H
Belgium	BE	Member	B	#
Bulgaria	BG	Member	#	U
Canada	CA	Member	# or L	#
Croatia	HR	Member	A	B
Czech Republic	CZ	Member	#	G
Denmark	DK	Member	R	#
Estonia	EE	Member	#	J
Finland	FI	Member	A	G
France	FR	Member	F or M	#
Germany	DE	Member	C or D	#
Greece	GR	Member	G	#
Hungary	HU	Member	#	V
Iceland	IS	Member	S	#
Italy	IT	Member	A	#
Latvia	LV	Member	A	D
Lithuania	LT	Member	#	R
Luxembourg	LU	Member	B	#
Macedonia, The Former Yugoslav Republic of	MK	Member	A	C
Montenegro	ME	Member	A	W
Netherlands	NL	Member	H	#
Norway	NO	Member	N	#
Poland	PL	Member	#	H
Portugal	PT	Member	P	#
Romania	RO	Member	#	L
Slovakia	SK	Member	#	M
Slovenia	SI	Member	#	Q
Spain	ES	Member	#	B
Sweden	SE	Member	A	N
Turkey	TR	Member	T	#
United Kingdom	GB	Member	U or K	#
United States	US	Member	#	#
Afghanistan	AF	Tier 1	A	Q
Argentina	AR	Tier 1	W	#
Bosnia and Herzegovina	BA	Tier 1	A	U
Brunei Darussalam	BN	Tier 1	A	V
Chile	CL	Tier 1	A	A
Colombia	CO	Tier 1	A	Z
Egypt	EG	Tier 1	#	D
Georgia	GE	Tier 1	A	R
India	IN	Tier 1	#	Y
Indonesia	ID	Tier 1	#	Z
Israel	IL	Tier 1	#	A
Jordan	JO	Tier 1	A	X
Kuwait	KW	Tier 1	A	K
Morocco	MA	Tier 1	A	M
Oman	OM	Tier 1	A	E
Papua New Guinea	PG	Tier 1	A	P
Peru	PE	Tier 1	A	Y
Philippines	PH	Tier 1	#	P
Saudi Arabia	SA	Tier 1	#	E
Serbia	RS	Tier 1	A	S
South Africa	ZA	Tier 1	V	#
Thailand	TH	Tier 1	#	C
Tonga	TO	Tier 1	#	T
Ukraine	UA	Tier 1	A	J
United Arab Emirates	AE	Tier 1	#	W
Australia	AU	Tier 2	Z	#
Austria	AT	Tier 2	#	N
Brazil	BR	Tier 2	#	K
Japan	JP	Tier 2	J	#
Korea, Republic of	KR	Tier 2	#	F
Malaysia	MY	Tier 2	Y	#
New Zealand	NZ	Tier 2	E	#
Russian Federation	RU	Tier 2	A	F
Singapore	SG	Tier 2	Q	#
Fiji	FJ	Other	#	S
Pakistan	PK	Other	A	T

== See also ==
- Authoritative Legal Entity Identifier (ALEI)
- Data Universal Numbering System (DUNS) - Issued by Dun & Bradstreet; required for certain US government contractors and Federal grant recipients
- DoDAAC - Issued by the US DoD
- Employer Identification Number (EIN) - Issued by US IRS, tax identification number for organizations and employers
- International Business Registration Number (IBRN)
- Military logistics
- Trading Partner Identification Number (TPIN)
