= Employer Identification Number =

Internal Revenue Service identification number

The Employer Identification Number (EIN), also known as the Federal Employer Identification Number (FEIN) or the Federal Tax Identification Number (FTIN), is a unique nine-digit number assigned by the Internal Revenue Service (IRS) to business entities operating in the United States for the purposes of tax reconciliation and identification.

When the number is used for identification rather than employment tax reporting, it is usually referred to as a Taxpayer Identification Number (TIN). When used for the purposes of reporting employment taxes, it is usually referred to as an EIN.

An EIN should not be used in tax lien auctions or sales, lotteries, or for any other purposes not related to tax administration.

== Comparison to social security numbers ==
A social security number (SSN) is a nine-digit number assigned to US citizens and permanent residents. It is used by the US government to track an individual's earnings, taxes, and employment, as well as eligibility for certain social benefits after retirement. SSNs are considered sensitive information and can be used to perpetrate identity theft, so they are only shared in limited situations, such as with employers, government entities, insurance agencies, and banks. SSNs can be used to validate the state and year of issuance if issued prior to 2011.

Unlike an SSN, an EIN is not considered sensitive information and is freely distributed by many businesses in print or over the internet.

The EIN serves an administrative purpose similar to that of an SSN, but for a business entity rather than an individual person. In some cases, such as a sole proprietorship, an SSN may be used as a business tax ID. However, an EIN is required to hire employees or establish business credit.

== EIN format ==
The EIN system was created by the IRS in 1974 by Treasury Decision (TD) 7306, 39 Fed. Reg. 9946. The authority for EINs is derived from 26 USC 6011(b), requiring taxpayer identification for the purpose of payment of employment taxes. The provision was first enacted as part of the revision of the Tax Code in 1954. This authority was broadened in 1961 by 26 USC 6109. An EIN is usually written in the form 00-0000000, whereas a social security number is usually written in the form 000-00-0000 to differentiate between the two. There are EIN Decoders on the web that can identify in what state the company registered the EIN.

A business needs an EIN in order to pay employees and to file business tax returns, as well as to open corporate accounts with financial institutions such as banks, credit unions, and brokerage houses. To be considered a Partnership, LLC, Corporation, S Corporation, Non-profit, etc. a business must obtain an EIN. This applies to businesses with no income, which are not exempt from filing federal income tax returns.

Before 2001, the first two digits of an EIN (the EIN prefix) indicated that the business was located in a particular geographic area. In 2001, EIN assignment was centralized at three of the IRS campuses, although all 10 campuses can assign an EIN if necessary.

| Campus | Code |
|---|---|
| Andover, Massachusetts | 10, 12 |
| Atlanta | 60, 67 |
| Austin | 50, 53 |
| Brookhaven (Holtsville), New York | 01, 02, 03, 04, 05, 06, 11, 13, 14, 16, 21, 22, 23, 25, 34, 51, 52, 54, 55, 56, 57, 58, 59, 65 |
| Cincinnati | 30, 32, 35, 36, 37, 38, 61 |
| Fresno | 15, 24 |
| Kansas City | 40, 44 |
| Memphis | 94, 95 |
| Ogden, Utah | 80, 90 |
| Philadelphia | 33, 39, 41, 42, 43, 48, 62, 63, 64, 66, 68, 71, 72, 73, 74, 75, 76, 77, 82, 83, 84, 85, 86, 87, 88, 91, 92, 93, 98, 99 |
| Internet | 20, 26, 27, 45, 46, 47, 81 |
| Small Business Administration (SBA) | 31 |

== Tax-exempt, charitable, non-profit organizations, and EINs ==
The issuance of an EIN to a non-profit organization does not automatically grant tax-exempt status from the IRS, which must be obtained separately. Each chapter of a national non-profit organization must have its own EIN, but the central organization may file for a group tax exemption. Tax Exemption status is publicly searchable on the IRS website, allowing anyone to verify an entity's registration, status, and assets and liabilities. Before donating monies to a charity, it is advisable to verify the charity's IRS Form 990 tax-exempt status via the IRS Tax Exempt Organization Search.

Before applying for an EIN, it is always preferred to check whether the affected organization has been formed legally or not. Almost all organizations that apply for EINs can have their tax-exempt status automatically revoked if they have failed to file a necessary return or notice for a period of three years consecutively. Such a three-year period begins when the organization is legally formed; it is best to form the organization legally before applying for an EIN.

== EIN expiration and cancellation ==
EINs do not expire. Once an EIN has been issued to an entity, it will never be reissued, although a business may elect to cancel or change its current EIN for specific reasons. Examples include purchasing or becoming a subsidiary of another business, changes to the ownership structure of the business, or if a sole proprietorship is subject to bankruptcy proceedings. Changes to business location or business name does not require getting a new EIN, but the change still needs to be reported to the IRS. A change of business address can be reported using IRS Form 8822-B. A change of business structure can be reported with IRS Form 8832.

A new EIN assigned to a business will automatically replace an existing EIN, and the old EIN will become inactive and not be reissued. Likewise, if a business is dissolved, the EIN will become inactive, closing the account with the IRS. There is no way to cancel or remove an EIN, as it is a permanent Federal taxpayer identification number once assigned.

== See also ==
- CAGE Code issued by the Defense Logistics Information Service (DLIS) to identify suppliers to the Department of Defense
- D.U.N.S. number issued by Dun & Bradstreet and required for certain US government contractors and federal grant recipients
- Confidential T.P.I.N. number issued by the Central Contractor Registry of the US Government
- VAT identification number, the analogous identification in the European Union and other countries using VAT
