= Photosensitive anodized aluminum =

Photosensitive anodized aluminum, also referred to as photo anodized aluminum or photo metal, utilizes the porous nature of unsealed anodized aluminum to create a sub-surface image. The image can be created either through exposure and development of an anodic layer impregnated with silver compounds (Type 1), much like traditional black and white photography, or through the use of a photomask (Type 2) and chemical etching, color addition, or color subtraction.

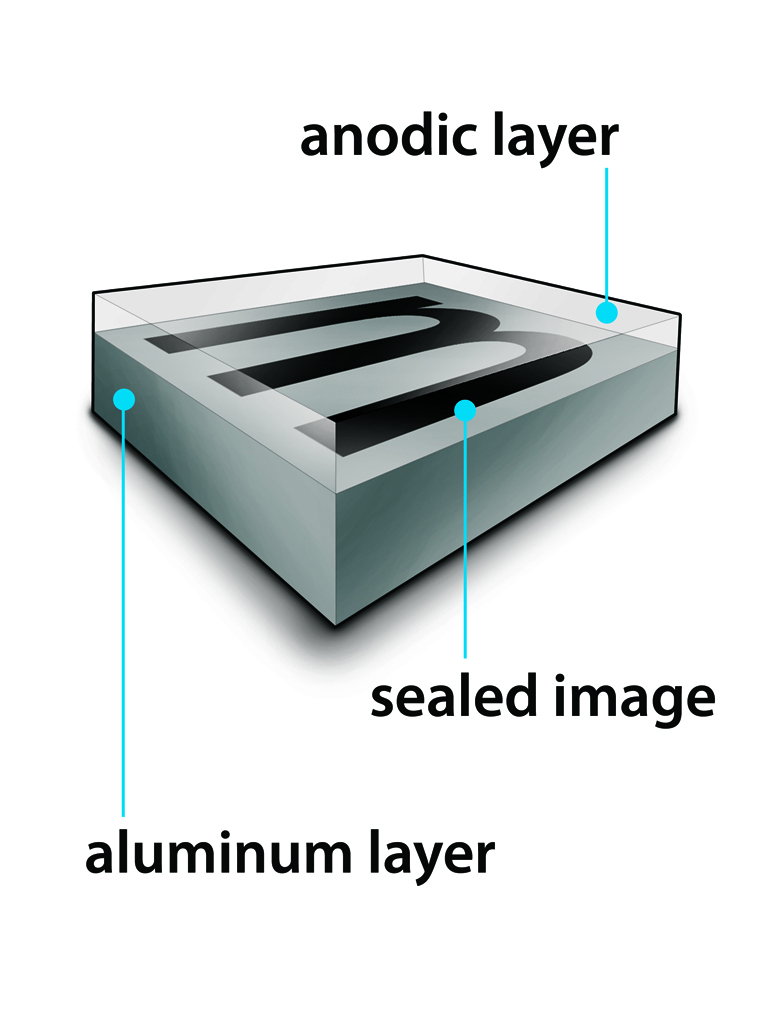
Cross-section

== Technology ==
Type 1 photosensitive anodized aluminum is anodized aluminum that has been impregnated with a silver compound which, when exposed to a light source, creates an activated latent image. Upon development and fixing a black, silver-based image is formed inside of the metal. Type 1 photosensitive anodized aluminum is then sealed in boiling water similarly to common anodized aluminum. Sealing hydrates the aluminum oxide surface, trapping the image beneath the anodized layer. The combined benefits of UV stability and the high image resolution of silver photography along with the abrasion and corrosion resistance of anodized aluminum are used to advantage in applications where permanent product identification is critical such as equipment nameplates, IUID barcode labels, outdoor signage, safety/warning plates, machine control panels and fine art.

Type 2 photosensitive anodized aluminum is typically coated with a photo resist, which may be of either the positive or negative type. Exposure of the photo resist through a negative and its subsequent development creates areas on the plate that are either protected by the resist or exposed to the effects of the dye, bleach, or etchant that are used to create the contrasting mark. Type 2 photosensitive anodized aluminum must be sealed just like Type 1. Common use for Type 2 applications are those where color (other than black) is desired on the finished product. The dyes used to create colored Type 2 plates can vary significantly in their heat and color fastness, so are often limited to indoor or short-term outdoor usage. Note that colored dyes can also be incorporated into Type 1 photosensitive anodized aluminum.

== History ==
Type 1 photosensitive anodized aluminum was developed in 1950 by Horizons Research Incorporated and is sold today by Horizons Imaging Systems Group under the Metalphoto® brand name.

== Industrial and military specification ==
Photosensitive anodized aluminum was qualified to Federal Specification GG-P-455 in 1965, a document that outlines the performance of Type 1 and Type 2 photosensitive anodized aluminum. Since qualification to GG-P-455, photosensitive anodized aluminum has been specified by many military, government and industrial organizations, including:

Testing Organization	Market Application
NASA, Johnson Space Center Texas Document Reference: Space Station Inventory Label Specification SSP 50007	Space Environments
Honeywell, Inc. Satellite Systems Operations Document Reference: Memorandum A3-J024-M-9500916, Laboratory Case 161311	Space Environments
Norwegian Marine Technology Research Institute (Marintek) Document Reference: Corrosion test of Anodized aluminum plates – Metalphoto 23.1011.00.0391	Marine/Shipbuilding and Repair
U.S. Army/Navy Document Reference: Mil –P-514D, Commercial Item Description Plate, Identification	Military Vessels Army Vehicles
Canadian Standards Association (CSA) Document Reference: File 11133–1, Class 7991	General Industrial
Underwriters Laboratories Document Reference: Marking and Labeling Systems PGDQ2	General Industrial
United States Federal Government Document Reference: Federal Specification GG-P-455	Tested for use by all Federal Agencies

In 2012 the Naval Surface Warfare Center (NSWC), Corona Division conducted tests on several IUID materials and found that Metalphoto photosensitive anodized aluminum achieved the highest score on more environmental survivability tests than any other IUID label material evaluated. Type 1 photosensitive anodized aluminum is certified to several military and federal specifications:

- MIL-A-8625F, Amendment 1, for photosensitized nameplates (Ref. Section 3.4.2.2)
- DMS-1674G, Class 1 Types 1,2 and 3 and Class 2
- MIL-DTL-15024F Type G and Type H (.012 and thicker)
- MIL-DTL-19834C (.003", foil)
- A-A-50271 (superseding Mil-P-514D), Composition A, Class 2 and Composition C
- MIL-STD-130N

== Notable uses ==
Over the years, photosensitive anodized aluminum has been used in several notable applications, including:

- UID barcode labels used to track assets owned by the United States Military.
- Labels and schematics inside of fighter jets including the F22, F-35 Joint Strike Fighter and F-18 Super Hornet.
- Low-reflection labels on combat night vision goggles.
- Inventory labels on the International Space Station.
- Landscape architecture and environmental design installations such as the Norma's Garden at the Gathering Place and the Mariemont School Foundation Donor Display.
- Modular Synthesizer front panels
