= Reference data =

Data used to classify or categorize other data

Reference data is data used to classify or categorize other data. Typically, they are static or slowly changing over time.

Examples of reference data include:

- Units of measurement
- Country codes
- Corporate codes
- Fixed conversion rates e.g., weight, temperature, and length
- Calendar structure and constraints

Reference data sets are sometimes alternatively referred to as a "controlled vocabulary" or "lookup" data.

Reference data differs from master data. While both provide context for business transactions, reference data is concerned with classification and categorisation, while master data is concerned with business entities. A further difference between reference data and master data is that a change to the reference data values may require an associated change in business process to support the change, while a change in master data will always be managed as part of existing business processes. For example, adding a new customer or sales product is part of the standard business process. However, adding a new product classification (e.g. "restricted sales item") or a new customer type (e.g. "gold level customer") will result in a modification to the business processes to manage those items.

== Externally-defined reference data ==
For most organisations, most or all reference data is defined and managed within that organisation. Some reference data, however, may be externally defined and managed, for example by standards organizations. An example of externally defined reference data is the set of country codes as defined in ISO 3166-1.

== Reference data management ==
Curating and managing reference data is key to ensuring its quality and thus fitness for purpose. All aspects of an organisation, operational and analytical, are greatly dependent on the quality of an organization's reference data. Without consistency across business process or applications, for example, similar things may be described in quite different ways. Reference data gain in value when they are widely re-used and widely referenced.

Examples of good practice in reference data management include:

1. Formalize the reference data management
2. Use external reference data as much as possible
3. Govern the reference data specific to your enterprise
4. Manage reference data at enterprise level
5. Version control your reference data

== See also ==
- Master data
- Data modeling
- Master data management
- Enterprise bookmarking
- Data architecture
- Transaction data
- Code (metadata)
