= Defense Logistics Information Service =

The DLA Logistics Information Service (DLIS), or formerly the Defense Logistics Information Service provides logistics and information technology services to the United States Department of Defense, Federal agencies, and international partners. It is headquartered at the Hart–Dole–Inouye Federal Center in Battle Creek, Michigan.

The primary product of DLIS is the publication of defense logistics data via its WEBFLIS and FED LOG products. Both products are secured for view only by authorized personnel through the AMPS technology provisioning service.

DLIS created their WEBFLIS system in 2001 modeled on that of other established commercial systems at the time which included the awarded WEBFLIS service of Now! Components and the procurement database created for the Government of Japan in 1992.
