= Numbering scheme =

System of rules for assigning mathematical values to database items

A numbering scheme is a process of assigning nominal numbers to entities. These generally require an agreed set of rules, or a central coordinator. The schemes can be considered to be examples of a primary key of a database management system table, whose table definitions require a database design.

In computability theory, the simplest numbering scheme is the assignment of natural numbers to a set of objects such as functions, rational numbers, graphs, or words in some formal language. A numbering can be used to transfer the idea of computability and related concepts, which are originally defined on the natural numbers using computable functions, to these different types of objects.

A simple extension is to assign cardinal numbers to physical objects according to the choice of some base of reference and of measurement units for counting or measuring these objects within a given precision. In such case, numbering is a kind of classification, i.e. assigning a numeric property to each object of the set to subdivide this set into related subsets forming a partition of the initial set, possibly infinite and not enumeratable using a single natural number for each class of the partition.

In some cases (such as computing, time-telling, and in some countries the numbering of floors in buildings) zero-based numbering is used, where the first entity is assigned "zero" instead of "one".

== Chemistry ==
- CAS Registry Numbers for chemical compounds
- EC numbers for identifying enzymes
- UN numbers for (classes of) hazardous substances
- E numbers for food additives

== Communications ==
- The E.164 numbering plan for telephone numbers, including:
  - Telephone country codes
  - North American Numbering Plan
  - Numbering plans by country
- The IP address allocation scheme (IANA)
- The DNIC prefixes of X.25 NUAs (Network User Address) assigned by the ITU
- Object identifiers (OID)

== Computing ==
- Line number

== Products ==
- The GS1 numbering scheme, including
  - GTIN for products, which includes the UPC and EAN-13 barcodes
  - ISBN codes for books
  - ISSN codes for periodicals
- Vehicle identification number
- Stock keeping unit (SKU)

== People ==
=== Identification numbers ===
- National identification numbers
  - Personal Numeric Code (Romania)
  - Personal identification number (Denmark)
  - Social Security number (United States)
  - Social insurance number (Canada)
  - INSEE number (France)
  - National Insurance number (United Kingdom)
  - Aadhaar (India)
- Personal Public Service Number (Republic of Ireland)
- Tax file number (Australia)
- Unique Master Citizen Number (former Yugoslavia)
- Det Centrale Personregister (Denmark)

=== Ordinals for names ===
- Regnal numbers
  - Princes of Reuss
  - Popes' ordinals
- Generational ordinal suffix to names

== Topics ==
- Dewey Decimal Classification and Universal Decimal Classification for books
- West American Digest System legal topic numbering scheme

== Geography and transport ==
- Postal codes
  - ZIP codes
- Geocodes (used also as fine-grained postal codes):
  - Geohash
  - Open Location Code
- Global Location Numbers by GS1
- FIPS place codes
- House numbering schemes
- Floor numbering
- Room number
- See also: Country code; Address (geography).

=== Vehicles ===
- Vehicle registration plates
- British Carriage and Wagon Numbering and Classification
- British Rail locomotive and multiple unit numbering and classification
- UIC classification of goods wagons

=== Roads ===
Road numbering schemes

- Arlington County, Virginia, street-naming system
- China road numbering
- Great Britain road numbering scheme
- European route by UNECE
- Numbered highways in the United States
- Edmonton, Alberta#Street layout
- Montreal
- Highways in Australia#Route numbering systems

== Others/general ==
- API well numbers for numbering oil and gas wells in the United States
- Bank card number
- International Bank Account Number
- International Geo Sample Number (IGSN)
- International Statistical Classification of Diseases and Related Health Problems for diseases
- The MAC address allocation scheme for hardware addresses of certain networking products
- National Animal Identification System
- National Pokédex
- The NSAP allocation scheme
- Post office box
- Production code number
- Stamp numbering system
- Wikipedia markup syntax for numbered lists

== See also ==
- naming scheme
- Digital Object Identifier
- Pagination
  - Stephanus pagination for works of Plato
  - Bekker numbers for the works of Aristotle
- Persistent identifier
- Unique identifier
- UUID
