= Personal Public Service Number =

ID number for individuals in Ireland

Public Service identifier overview
- Formed: April 1979
- Jurisdiction: Ireland
- Key document: Social Welfare Consolidation Act 2005

The Personal Public Service Number (PPS Number or PPSN) (Irish: Uimhir Phearsanta Seirbhíse Poiblí, or Uimh. PSP) is a unique identifier of individuals in Ireland, acting as a national identification number. It is issued by the Client Identity Services section of the Department of Social Protection, on behalf of Ireland's Minister for Social Protection.

The PPS Number was known as the Revenue and Social Insurance Number (RSI No) until 1998. RSI Numbers were first issued in April 1979 as a replacement for the separate PAYE Number and Social Welfare Insurance Number which had been used for income tax and social welfare purposes respectively until then. The PAYE Number was issued by the Revenue Commissioners and these numbers were transferred to the RSI No system as a basis for the unified system.

Today, the PPS Number is used for accessing a wide range of public services in Ireland. The Department of Social Protection maintains a list of bodies that are legally authorised to use the PPS Number.

Everyone born in Ireland from 1971 onwards has a PPS Number: it is now assigned as part of the birth registration process. Similarly, a PPS Number has been assigned to anyone who has worked or received a Social Welfare payment in Ireland since 1979.

== Public Services Card ==
The PPS Number is a key element of the Public Services Card (PSC) issued by the Department of Social Protection. The PSC is designed to help people easily and safely authenticate their identity when they need to access public services.

The front of the card holds a person's name, photograph and signature, along with the card expiry date. The back of the card holds the person's PPS number and a card number. It also holds a magnetic stripe to enable social welfare payments such as pensions to be collected at post offices. For people who are entitled to free travel, the card will also display this information in the top left-hand corner.

The PSC was first introduced in 2011 for social welfare payments and is now being rolled out to other public services. It replaces both the Social Services Card, withdrawn by January 2014, and the old paper-based Free Travel Pass, which was phased out by 1 January 2016.

== PPS Number format ==
The format of the number is a unique alphanumeric in the general form 8765432A/A. The same format was used by the Department of Education as the "Pupil Number" since 1994 and this caused some concern and confusion as it was in the same format and used the same check character formula, but more often different from the PPS No. In August 2000 the department instigated a programme to remove the Pupil Number and replace it with the PPS No in future on records. By September 2001, the Pupil Number was fully withdrawn.

The format is seven numeric characters (including leading zeros), a check character and sometimes a second letter, which if it exists, will normally be an A or a B (for individuals) or an H (for non-individuals, e.g., limited companies, trusts, etc.) In some cases, this second letter may be a W, which was used for women – "W" from "wife" – who married and automatically adopted the same number as their husband, though this practice stopped in 1999 chiefly due to equal rights concerns. The present policy is that these W numbers are eliminated when the bearer's husband dies, or when they become separated or divorced.

== Check character ==
The format of the PPS number was defined as being nine characters in length, consisting of 7 digits in positions 1 to 7, followed by a check character in position 8, with either a space or the letter "W" in position 9. However, from 1 January 2013 a new range of PPS numbers were introduced by including an additional alphabetic character, other than "W", in position 9.

The character in position 8 still operates as the check character for all existing and new numbers, but the calculation used to decide this character has been revised to avoid any confusion between an old number and a new number using the same 7 numeric values in the first 7 positions.

The check character is calculated using a weighted addition of all the numbers and modulus calculation (known as Modulus 23). It therefore checks for incorrectly entered digits and for digit transposition (digits in the wrong order will alter the sum due to weightings).

=== Calculation ===
The modulus 23 calculation has been revised to take account of the extra character as follows:

1. A numeric value is assigned to the alphabetic character in position 9, with "A" = 1, "B" = 2, "C" = 3, etc. Where a "W" or a blank already exists (in numbers assigned before 1 January 2013) the assigned numeric value will be zero.
2. Each digit is multiplied by a weight, with a weighting of 9 assigned to the numeric equivalent of the alphabetic character in position 9. See the table for a sample calculation on the PPSN "1234567_A".

| Digit | Weighting | Result |
|---|---|---|
| 1 | 8 | 1 * 8 = 8 |
| 2 | 7 | 2 * 7 = 14 |
| 3 | 6 | 3 * 6 = 18 |
| 4 | 5 | 4 * 5 = 20 |
| 5 | 4 | 5 * 4 = 20 |
| 6 | 3 | 6 * 3 = 18 |
| 7 | 2 | 7 * 2 = 14 |
| A(1) | 9 | 1 * 9 = 9 |

The results are added together, and divided by 23. The remainder (modulus 23) indicate the check character position in the alphabet. In the example above, 121 divided by 23 leaves a remainder of 6, and "F" is the sixth character in the alphabet. The correct PPS number is therefore 1234567FA. Where the remainder is zero, the check letter is W.

=== Check digit calculation in software ===
The following are examples of software that provide checksum verification:

PHP: The Pear class Validate_IE contains a checksum algorithm.

Thesaurus Software Thesaurus Payroll Manager payroll software.

Sage QuickPay payroll software.

== Expansion ==
As the system allows for a maximum of ten million numbers to be issued, and with numbers having been issued to both the Irish and the legal immigrant population, expatriates, and many people who are now deceased, the current system will be in need of expansion in the not distant future.

Since January 2013, the format uses a letter after the current check character. This has the advantage that all current PPS numbers remain valid. The letter after the check character would have a weighting of nine. The letter value would be assigned the same as the check character's. A=1, B=2 ... W=0.

== Usage ==
The number is currently used for a number of public services including education, health, housing, social welfare and tax however the net is widening raising concern about functionality creep. The number is underpinned in legislation by the Social Welfare Consolidation Act 2005 (Section 262) and a number of amendments, including data protection, have expanded its legal use as well as defining improper usage.

The number has already been issued automatically to everyone born in Ireland since January 1971 and those who commenced or were in employment since April 1979 – the primary trigger today for the numbers' issue is birth registration. A PPS number can be applied for at a PPS Number allocation centre. Applicants should show the reason for requiring a PPS Number, and provide Photographic ID and proof of address.

== See also ==
- National identification number
- NHI Number (a similar number in New Zealand)
- National Insurance number (a similar number in the United Kingdom)
- Social insurance number (a similar number in Canada)
- Tax file number (a similar number in Australia)
- Social Security number (a similar number in the United States)
- CPF (a similar number in Brazil)
