= ICDX =

ICDX may refer to:

- ICD-10
- Indonesia Commodity and Derivatives Exchange
