= Data corruption =

Errors in computer data that introduce unintended changes to the original data

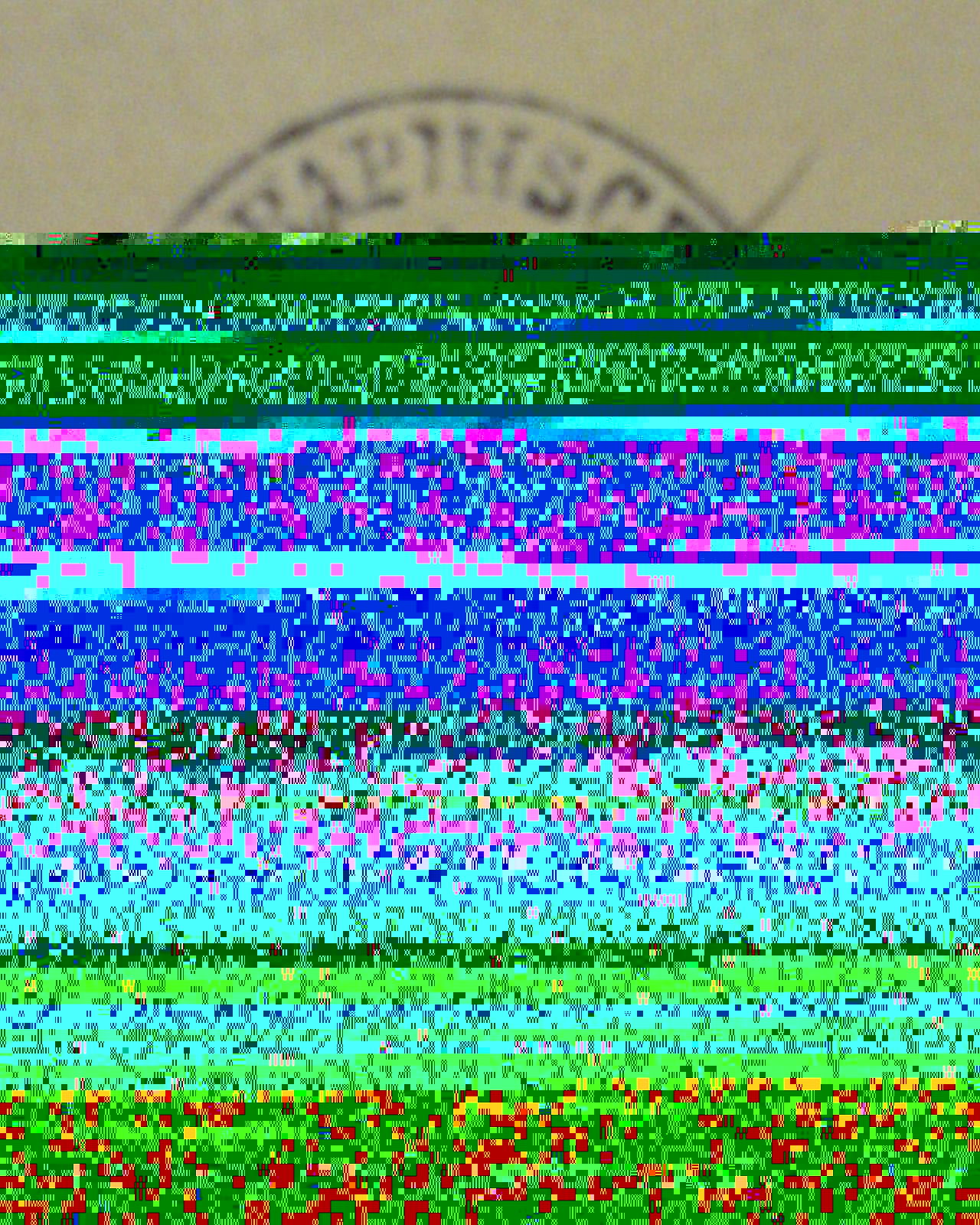
Photo data corruption; in this case, a result of a failed data recovery from a hard disk drive

Data corruption is the undesired alteration in computer data that occurs during writing, reading, storage, transmission, or processing. Computer systems use a number of measures to provide end-to-end data integrity, or lack of errors.

In general, when data corruption occurs, a file containing that data will produce unexpected results when accessed by the system or the related application. Results could range from a minor loss of data to a system crash. For example, if a document file is corrupted, when a person tries to open that file with a document editor they may get an error message, thus the file might not be opened or might open with some of the data corrupted (or in some cases, completely corrupted, leaving the document unintelligible). The adjacent image is a corrupted image file in which most of the information has been lost.

Some types of malware may intentionally corrupt files as part of their payloads, usually by overwriting them with inoperative or garbage code, while a non-malicious virus may also unintentionally corrupt files when it accesses them. If a virus or trojan with this payload method manages to alter files critical to the running of the computer's operating system software or physical hardware, the entire system may be rendered unusable.

Some programs can give a suggestion to repair the file automatically (after the error), and some programs cannot repair it. It depends on the level of corruption, and the built-in functionality of the application to handle the error. There are various causes of the corruption.

== Overview ==
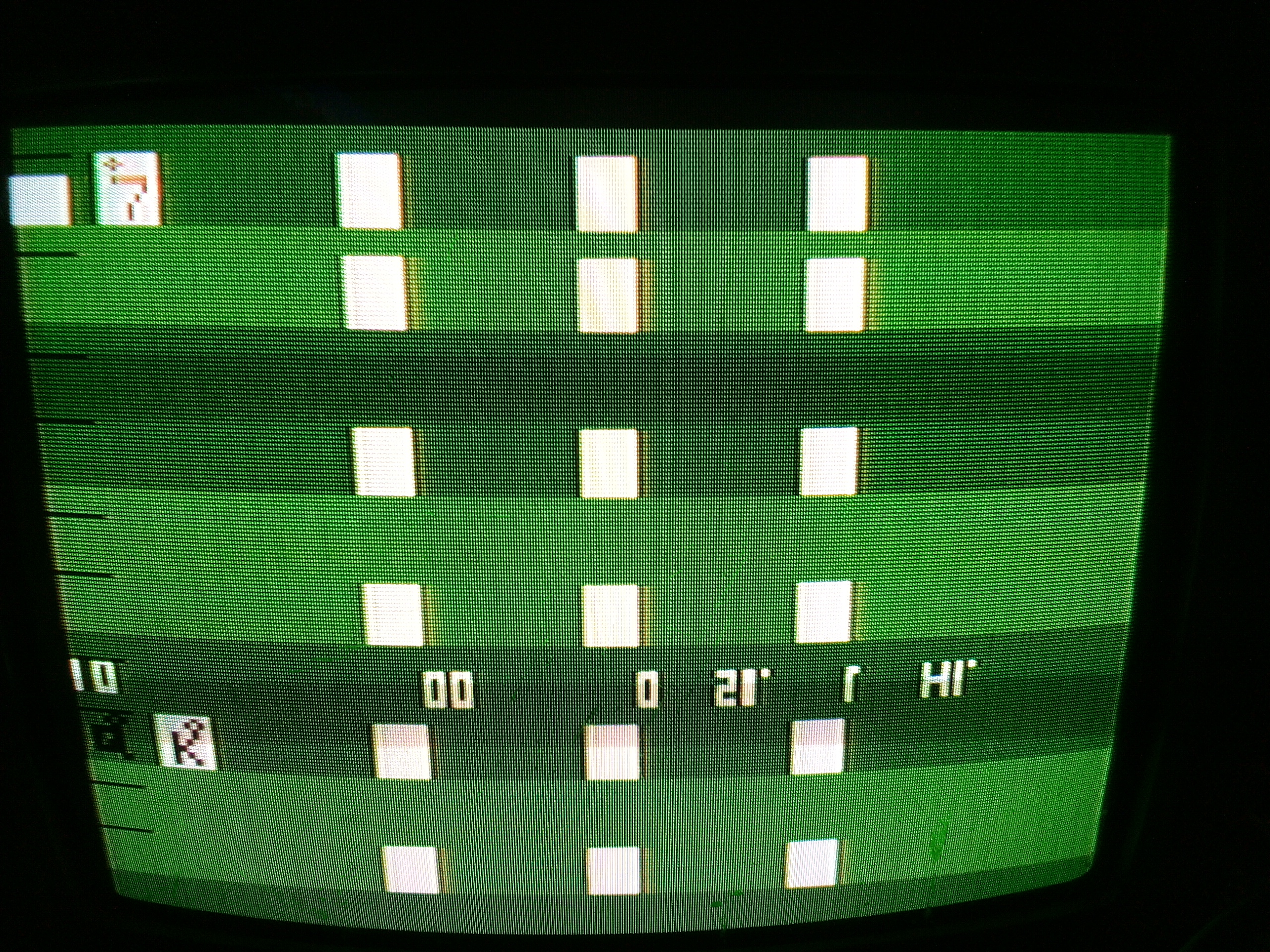
Screen output of an Atari 2600 with corrupted RAM.

A video that has been corrupted, displaying bright flashing light and color

There are two types of data corruption associated with computer systems: undetected and detected. Undetected data corruption, also known as silent data corruption, results in the most dangerous errors as there is no indication that the data is incorrect. Detected data corruption may be permanent with the loss of data, or may be temporary when some part of the system is able to detect and correct the error; there is no data corruption in the latter case.

Data corruption can occur at any level in a system, from the host to the storage medium. Modern systems attempt to detect corruption at many layers and then recover or correct the corruption; this is almost always successful but very rarely the information arriving in the systems memory is corrupted and can cause unpredictable results.

Data corruption during transmission has a variety of causes. Interruption of data transmission causes information loss. Environmental conditions can interfere with data transmission, especially when dealing with wireless transmission methods. Heavy clouds can block satellite transmissions. Wireless networks are susceptible to interference from devices such as microwave ovens.

Hardware and software failure are the two main causes for data loss. Background radiation, head crashes, and aging or wear of the storage device fall into the former category, while software failure typically occurs due to bugs in the code. Cosmic rays cause most soft errors in DRAM.

== Silent ==
Some errors go unnoticed, without being detected by the disk firmware or the host operating system; these errors are known as silent data corruption.

There are many error sources beyond the disk storage subsystem itself. For instance, cables might be slightly loose, the power supply might be unreliable, external vibrations such as a loud sound, the network might introduce undetected corruption, cosmic radiation and many other causes of soft memory errors, etc. In 39,000 storage systems that were analyzed, firmware bugs accounted for 5–10% of storage failures. The error rates as observed by a CERN study on silent corruption are far higher than one in every 10^{16} bits. Amazon Web Services acknowledged that data corruption was the cause of a widespread outage of their Amazon S3 storage network in 2008. In 2021, faulty processor cores were identified as an additional cause in publications by Google and Facebook; cores were found to be faulty at a rate of several in thousands of cores.

One problem is that hard disk drive capacities have increased substantially, but their error rates remain unchanged. The data corruption rate has always been roughly constant in time, meaning that modern disks are not much safer than old disks. In old disks the probability of data corruption was very small because they stored tiny amounts of data. In modern disks the probability is much larger because they store much more data, whilst not being safer. That way, silent data corruption has not been a serious concern while storage devices remained relatively small and slow. In modern times and with the advent of larger drives and very fast RAID setups, users are capable of transferring 10^{16} bits in a reasonably short time, thus easily reaching the data corruption thresholds.

As an example, ZFS creator Jeff Bonwick stated that the fast database at Greenplum, which is a database software company specializing in large-scale data warehousing and analytics, faces silent corruption every 15 minutes. As another example, a real-life study performed by NetApp on more than 1.5 million HDDs over 41 months found more than 400,000 silent data corruptions, out of which more than 30,000 were not detected by the hardware RAID controller (only detected during scrubbing). Another study, performed by CERN over six months and involving about 97 petabytes of data, found that about 128 megabytes of data became permanently corrupted silently somewhere in the pathway from network to disk.

Silent data corruption may result in cascading failures, in which the system may run for a period of time with undetected initial error causing increasingly more problems until it is ultimately detected. For example, a failure affecting file system metadata can result in multiple files being partially damaged or made completely inaccessible as the file system is used in its corrupted state.

== Countermeasures ==
When data corruption behaves as a Poisson process, where each bit of data has an independently low probability of being changed, data corruption can generally be detected by the use of checksums, and can often be corrected by the use of error correcting codes (ECC).

If an uncorrectable data corruption is detected, procedures such as automatic retransmission or restoration from backups can be applied. Certain levels of RAID disk arrays have the ability to store and evaluate parity bits for data across a set of hard disks and can reconstruct corrupted data upon the failure of a single or multiple disks, depending on the level of RAID implemented. Some CPU architectures employ various transparent checks to detect and mitigate data corruption in CPU caches, CPU buffers and instruction pipelines; an example is Intel Instruction Replay technology, which is available on Intel Itanium processors.

Many errors are detected and corrected by the hard disk drives using the ECC codes which are stored on disk for each sector. If the disk drive detects multiple read errors on a sector it may make a copy of the failing sector on another part of the disk, by remapping the failed sector of the disk to a spare sector without the involvement of the operating system (though this may be delayed until the next write to the sector). This "silent correction" can be monitored using S.M.A.R.T. and tools available for most operating systems to automatically check the disk drive for impending failures by watching for deteriorating SMART parameters.

Some file systems, such as Btrfs, HAMMER, ReFS, and ZFS, use internal data and metadata checksumming to detect silent data corruption. In addition, if a corruption is detected and the file system uses integrated RAID mechanisms that provide data redundancy, such file systems can also reconstruct corrupted data in a transparent way. This approach allows improved data integrity protection covering the entire data paths, which is usually known as end-to-end data protection, compared with other data integrity approaches that do not span different layers in the storage stack and allow data corruption to occur while the data passes boundaries between the different layers.

Data scrubbing is another method to reduce the likelihood of data corruption, as disk errors are caught and recovered from before multiple errors accumulate and overwhelm the number of parity bits. Instead of parity being checked on each read, the parity is checked during a regular scan of the disk, often done as a low priority background process. The "data scrubbing" operation activates a parity check. If a user simply runs a normal program that reads data from the disk, then the parity would not be checked unless parity-check-on-read was both supported and enabled on the disk subsystem.

If appropriate mechanisms are employed to detect and remedy data corruption, data integrity can be maintained. This is particularly important in commercial applications (e.g. banking), where an undetected error could either corrupt a database index or change data to drastically affect an account balance, and in the use of encrypted or compressed data, where a small error can make an extensive dataset unusable.

== See also ==
- Various resources:
  - Data degradation, also called data rot
  - Computer science
  - Data integrity
  - Database integrity
  - Radiation hardening
  - Software rot
- Countermeasures:
  - Data Integrity Field
  - ECC memory
  - Forward error correction
  - List of data recovery software
  - Parchive
  - RAID
  - Reed–Solomon error correction
