= Unique physician identification number =

Doctor identification system in the United States

A unique physician identification number (UPIN) was a six-character alpha-numeric identifier used by Medicare to identify doctors in the United States. They were discontinued in June 2007 and replaced by National Provider Identifier, or NPI numbers.

The United States Congress authorized the creation of UPIN IDs through Section 9202 of the Consolidated Omnibus Budget Reconciliation Act of 1985 (COBRA). The Centers for Medicare and Medicaid Services (CMS) was responsible for creation of the UPINs for each doctor accepting Medicare insurance.

A directory of UPINs was formerly available from the UPIN Registry, as required by Section 4164 of COBRA, but this service was discontinued after May 23, 2008.
