= Tax file number =

Identifier for taxpaying entities in Australia

A tax file number (TFN) is a unique identifier issued by the Australian Taxation Office (ATO) to each taxpaying entity—an individual, company, superannuation fund, partnership, or trust. Not all individuals have a TFN, and a business has both a TFN and an Australian Business Number (ABN). If a business earns income as part of carrying on its business, it may quote its ABN instead of its TFN.

The TFN was introduced initially to facilitate file tracking at the ATO, but has since been expanded to encompass income and other data matching. The TFN consists of a nine digit number, usually presented in the format nnn nnn nnn. Strict laws require that TFNs may be recorded or used only for specifically authorised tax-related purposes.

The TFN serves a purpose similar to the American Social Security number, but its use is strictly limited by law to avoid the functionality creep which has affected the US counterpart. It also serves a similar function as national insurance in the UK.

== History ==
TFNs have been used by the ATO since the 1930s. At some point in time between 1972 and 1983 the format of tax file numbers changed. The earlier format was still in use in 1972, and the later format was in use by 1983.

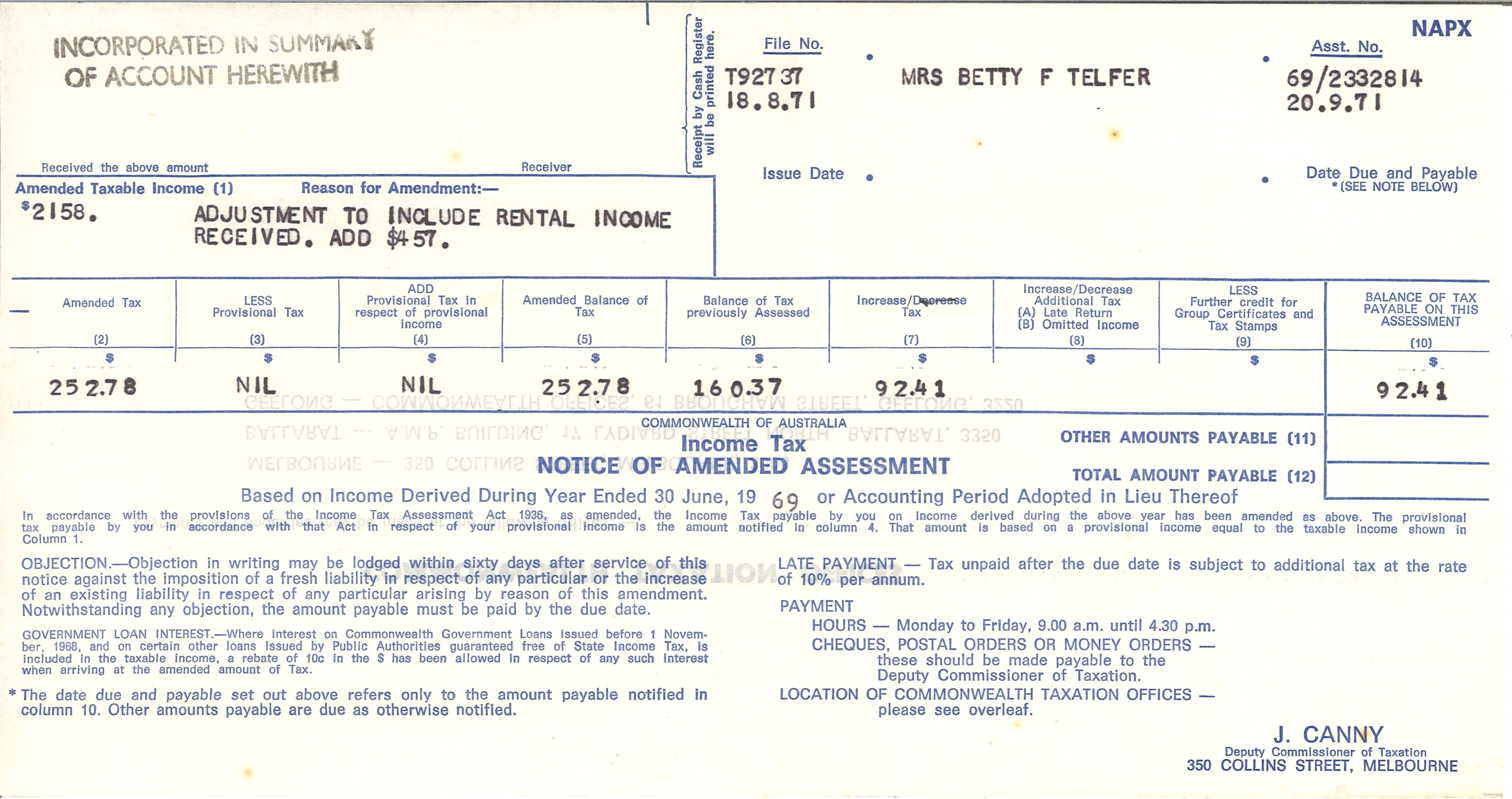
Notice of amended assessment 1969 – with tax file number T92737

Under the later format, the TFN itself was either 8 or 9 digits, with a check digit. Individuals received a 9 digit TFN and non-individuals received an 8 digit TFN. The quote of the TFN was not obligatory when, for example, lodging a tax return, though failing to quote one may delay the processing of the tax return.

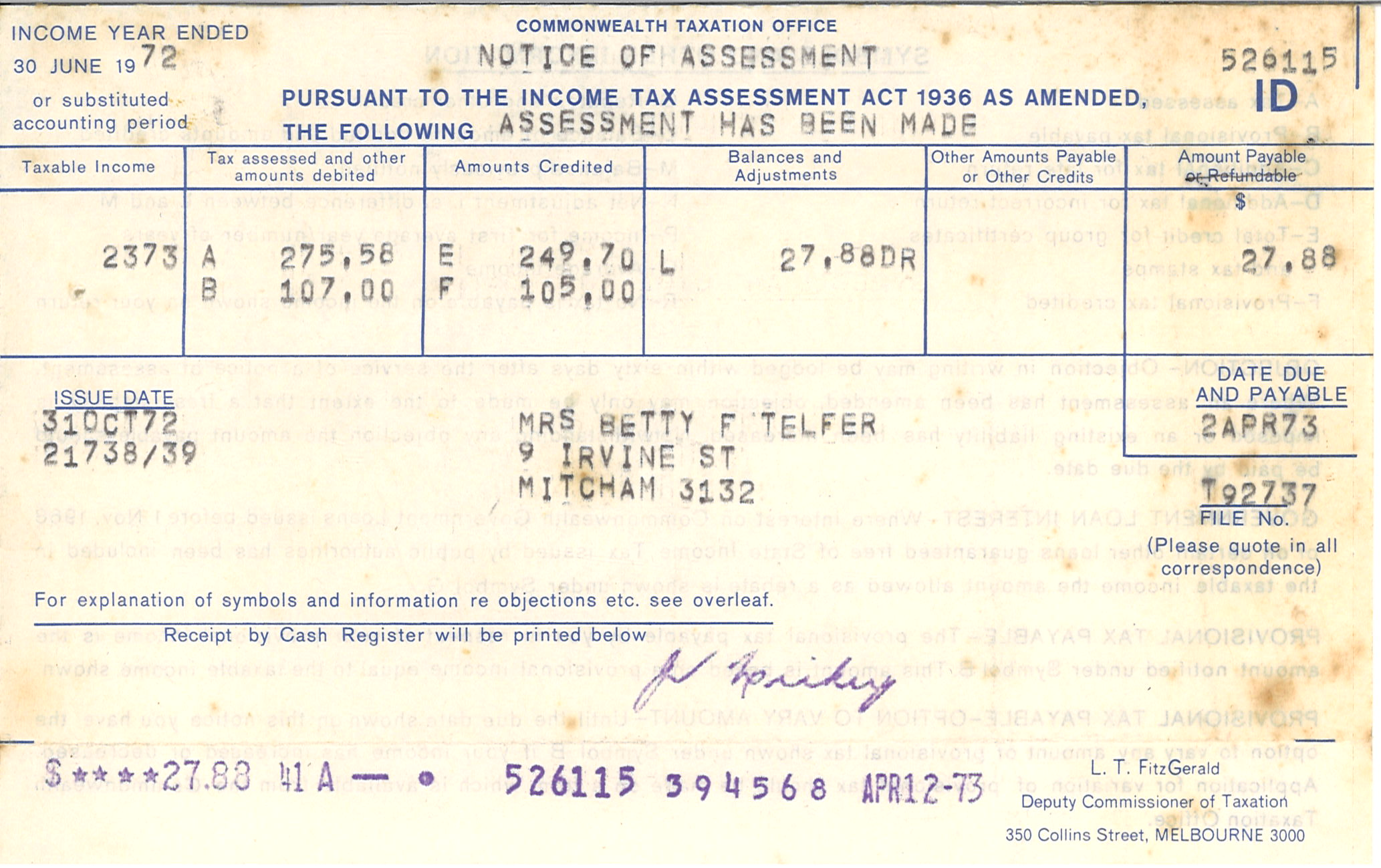
Notice of assessment 1972 - still using the tax file number/format T92737

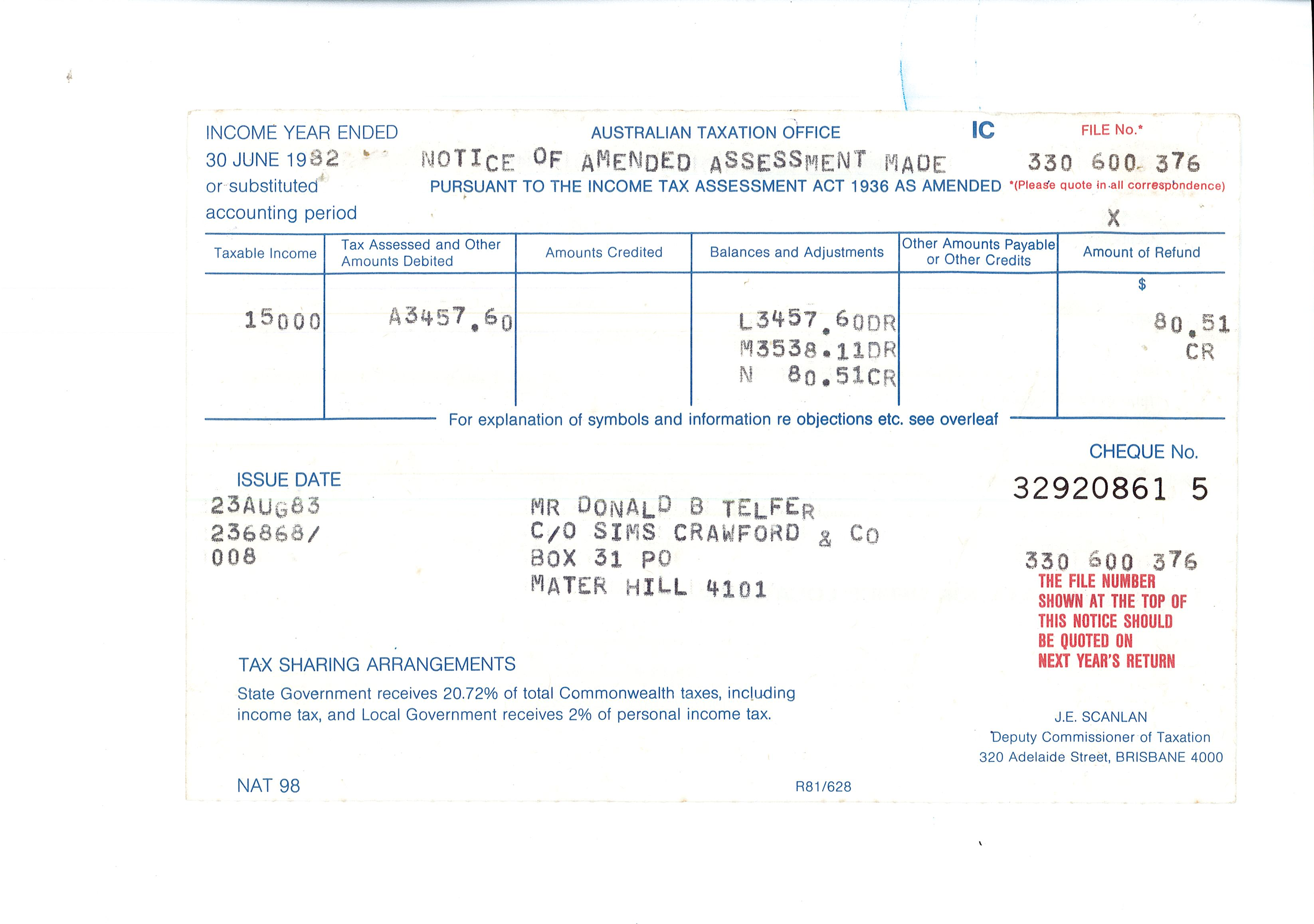
Notice of amended assessment 1982 – with a 9 digit tax file number 330 600 376

In May 1988, following the demise of the Australia Card scheme, the Treasurer Paul Keating announced that the Government intended to introduce an enhanced TFN scheme, and legislation establishing the scheme was passed that year.

When the legislation was introduced in 1988 the 8 and 9 digit TFN scheme still applied. However, as the 8 digit TFNs were becoming exhausted, all new taxpayers are issued 9 digit TFNs. The numbers now do not have any embedded meaning.

== Amnesty 1988 ==
One implication of the enhanced system using TFNs to match interest and dividend income with tax file numbers and their corresponding entities – or absence of TFNs/corresponding entities as the case may be – was that it would be increasingly difficult to hide such income from the ATO. There was also a risk that in cases where the undisclosed past tax liabilities were large, offenders could be identified and pursued for arrears plus severe penalties (a percentage of the arrears, plus interest on the arrears). In view of the new legislation, the ATO offered an amnesty from these penalties as incentive for affected persons to amend their returns for preceding years – by including previously undeclared interest income – pay their outstanding tax – without the available penalties being imposed on the increased tax liabilities.

Between May 1988 and October 31 1988 the ATO conducted this amnesty so that taxpayers who had previously failed to fully declare passive income such as bank interest, share dividends and so forth and other non-taxpayer persons who had failed to submit income tax returns in previous years could lodge retrospective amendments to returns or lodge retrospective returns. In such cases, persons claiming relief under the amnesty became liable for outstanding income tax, but were generally excused from fines and penalties that would have been imposed in the absence of the amnesty.

The amnesty was subsequently extended beyond October 31 1988, with late enrolled amnesty participants being given until April 15 1989 to lodge amended tax returns or lodge formerly missing returns disclosing additional previously undeclared income.

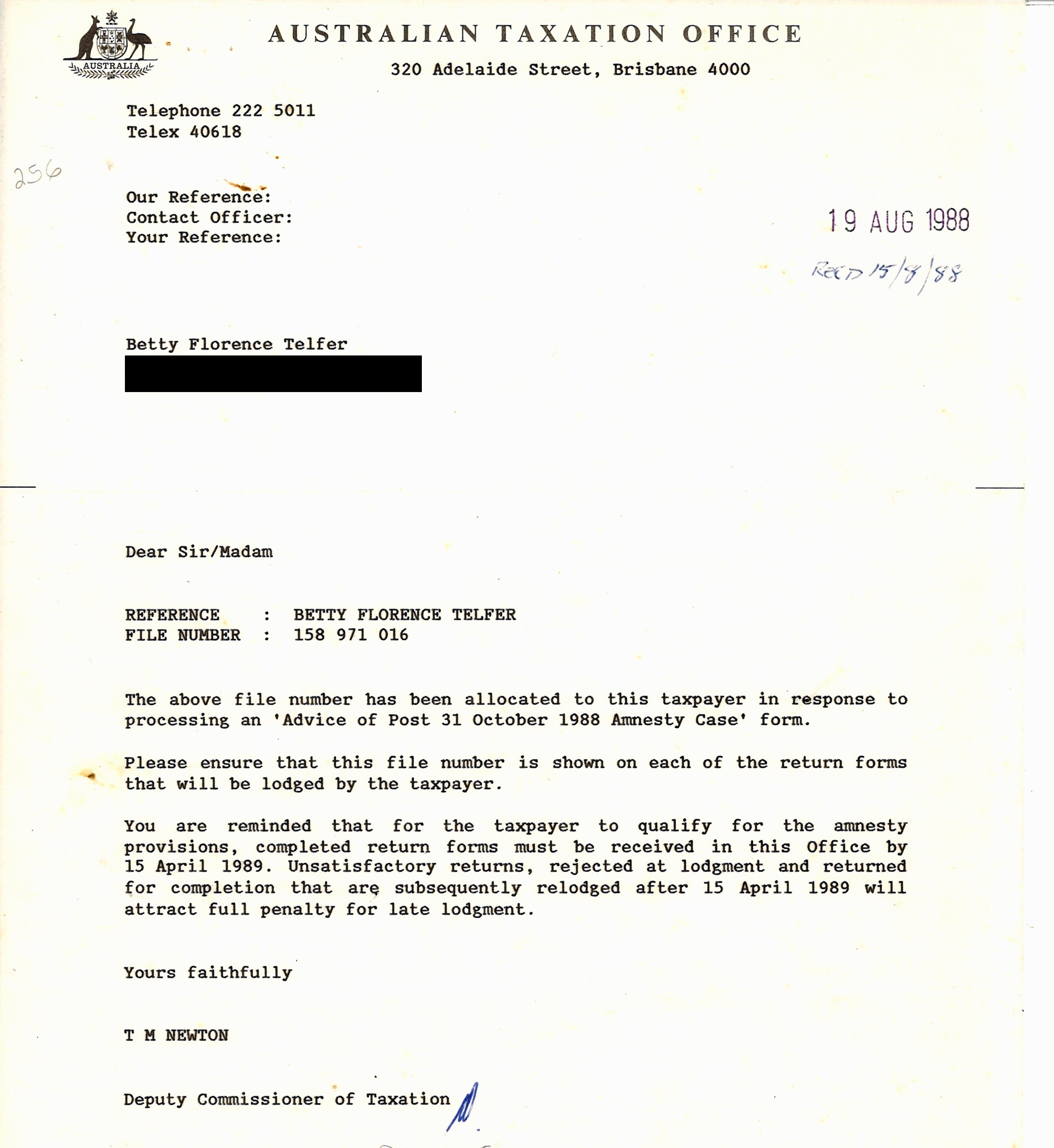
1988 ATO amnesty case – advice of issue of tax file number

In 2014 the ATO conducted a second amnesty, known as Project DOIT (Disclose Offshore Income Today). The 2014 Amnesty was directed at income overseas. The 2014 Amnesty is said to be the ATO's last amnesty.

== Data matching ==
The primary purpose of the enhanced TFN system is to allow the ATO to collect income and other information for taxpayers (officially known as "data matching"). This is done by the ATO requiring paying entities (e.g., banks, employers, public companies, superannuation funds, Centrelink and others) to electronically provide the ATO with information of certain types of payments made by them, together with the associated TFN of the recipient. When taxpayers file their income tax returns at the end of the financial year, the ATO can electronically match the income reported by the taxpayer against the payments reported by the paying entities.

The types of income payments covered by the TFN data matching rules include:

- Wages and salaries from employers (see PAYG), including fringe benefit and superannuation information
- Interest from banks and similar institutions, from all account types, including term deposits
- Interest from bonds and debentures
- Dividends from public companies
- Distributions from unit trusts, including cash management trusts
- Superannuation payments (amounts paid out to a beneficiary)
- Some government benefits, in particular unemployment benefits.

Other information provided to the ATO using the TFN includes health insurance information, as well as the purchase and sale of property, such as real estate and shares.

Because of the community backlash against the aborted Australia Card scheme, the expanded TFN rules are technically optional. The taxpayer entitled to such income payments has a choice between quoting the TFN, or not doing so. As a general rule taxpayers quote their TFN. Institutions usually help by reminding or inviting clients to do so on any new source of income (e.g., new accounts, new debentures, new shareholdings). Forms for quoting include a reminder of the key provisions of the system, for example from Computershare:

It is not an offence to withhold your TFN or, where the securities are held for a business purpose, your ABN. However, if you do not provide your TFN or ABN, tax may be deducted from payments of interest and the unfranked portion of dividends and distributions at the highest marginal rate.

If an account is held in the names of multiple investors, each may choose whether to quote or not, but tax is withheld unless at least two have done so.

== TFN withholding tax ==
In the few cases that a payee has not supplied the paying entity with their TFN by the time payment is to be made, unless if the payment is exempt, the paying entity is legally required to withhold a TFN withholding tax amount at the highest marginal tax rate (currently 47%) from the payment the paying entity is about to make. Similar but stricter rules apply to businesses which do not supply their customers with an ABN.

The paying entity would report the TFN and ABN withheld amounts on its next Business Activity Statement (BAS) and add the withheld amounts to the payment it needs to make to the ATO. The paying entity would also advise the recipient of the TFN withheld amount.

The TFN withheld amount becomes a prepayment of tax by the taxpayer whose funds have been withheld. When the taxpayer files an income tax return he or she would need to claim the so-called "TFN amounts" against his or her final tax liability, and any excess is refunded. The taxpayer needs to file an income tax return to get back the excess of tax.

== Exemptions ==
Some people and organisations are exempt from TFN withholding; they may state their exemption category instead of quoting a TFN. This includes:

- Income tax exempt organisations (e.g., schools, museums).
- Non-profit organisations.
- Recipients of government pensions who are 80 years and older.
- Children under 16 (earning up to $420 per year of interest, in 2005).
- Foreign residents for interest and dividends (they are subject to non-resident withholding tax instead).

People and organisations in these categories may still need to submit a tax return, but generally speaking these exemptions mean those not needing to submit a tax return don't need to get a tax file number.

The exemption for children does not apply to company dividends, and if a bank account is held in more than one name, it is only exempt if all account holders are under 16. Children can apply for a TFN and quote it in the same way as anyone else, if they wish.

For some forms of income, small earnings are exempt from TFN withholding for any account holder. For example, bank interest up to $120 per year is exempt. (However such amounts are still taxable income.)

== Issuing ==
TFNs are issued by the Australian Taxation Office. A new taxpayer receives a tax file number within about a month of making an application and providing proof of identity.

Centrelink helps those applying for certain benefits to apply for a TFN at the same time, if they do not already have one. For example, unemployment benefits are subject to the TFN withholding rules if a TFN is not quoted. A young person applying for such a benefit for the first time may have never previously needed a TFN.

Foreigners in Australia whose visas permit them to work can apply for a TFN online, using their passport number and visa number. Proof of identity is established by the ATO confirming those numbers with the Department of Immigration.

== Check digit ==
As is the case with many identification numbers, the TFN includes a check digit for detecting erroneous numbers. The algorithm is based on simple modulo 11 arithmetic per many other digit checksum schemes.

=== Example ===
The validity of the example TFN '123456782' can be checked by the following process

1		2		3		4		5		6		7		8		2
×		×		×		×		×		×		×		×		×
1		4		3		7		5		8		6		9		10
=		=		=		=		=		=		=		=		=
1	+	8	+	9	+	28	+	25	+	48	+	42	+	72	+	20	=	253

The sum of the numbers is 253 (1 + 8 + 9 + 28 + 25 + 48 + 42 + 72 + 20 = 253). 253 is a multiple of 11 (11 × 23 = 253). Therefore, the number is valid.

== See also ==
- IRD number (a similar number in New Zealand)
- National Insurance number (a similar number in the United Kingdom)
- PPS number (a similar number in Ireland)
- Social insurance number (a similar number in Canada)
- Social Security number (a similar number in the United States)
- Taxation in Australia
