= Entity integrity =

Concept in relational databases

Entity integrity is concerned with ensuring that each row of a table has a unique and non-null primary key value; this is the same as saying that each row in a table represents a single instance of the entity type modelled by the table. A requirement of E. F. Codd in his seminal paper is that a primary key of an entity, or any part of it, can never take a null value. The relational model states that every relation (or table) must have an identifier, called the primary key (abbreviated PK), in such a way that every row of the same relation be identifiable by its content, that is, by a unique and minimal value. The PK is a not empty set of attributes (or columns). The same format applies to the foreign key (abbreviated FK) because each FK matches a preexistent PK. Each of attributes being part of a PK (or of a FK) must have data values (such as numbers, letters or typographic symbols) but not data marks (also known as NULL marks in SQL world). Morphologically, a composite primary key is in a "steady state": If it is reduced, PK will lose its property of identifying every row of its relation but if it is extended, PK will be redundant.

== See also ==
- Domain integrity
- Data integrity
- Referential integrity
- Null (SQL)
