= National Provider Identifier =

Identification number issued to U.S. health care providers

A National Provider Identifier (NPI) is a unique 10-digit identification number issued to health care providers in the United States by the Centers for Medicare and Medicaid Services (CMS). The NPI has replaced the Unique Physician Identification Number (UPIN) as the required identifier for Medicare services and is used by other payers, including commercial healthcare insurers. The transition to the NPI was mandated as part of the Administrative Simplification portion of the Health Insurance Portability and Accountability Act of 1996 (HIPAA).

== Mandated uses ==
HIPAA–covered entities, such as providers completing electronic transactions, healthcare clearinghouses, and large health plans, were required by regulation to use only the NPI to identify covered healthcare providers by May 23, 2007. CMS subsequently announced that, as of May 23, 2008, it will not impose penalties on covered entities that deploy contingency plans to facilitate the compliance by their trading partners (e.g., healthcare providers who bill them). The posted guidance document can be used by covered entities to design and implement a contingency plan. Details are contained in a CMS document entitled "Guidance on Compliance with the HIPAA National Provider Identifier (NPI) Rule." Small health plans have one additional year to comply.

All individual HIPAA–covered healthcare providers or organizations must obtain an NPI for use in all HIPAA standard transactions, even if a billing agency prepares the transaction. Individual HIPAA–covered healthcare providers include physicians, pharmacists, physician assistants, midwives, nurse practitioners, nurse anesthetists, dentists, denturists, licensed opticians, optometrists, chiropractors, clinical social workers, professional counselors, physical therapists, occupational therapists, prosthetists, orthotists, pharmacy technicians, and athletic trainers. Organizations include hospitals, home health care agencies, nursing homes, residential treatment centers, group practices, laboratories, pharmacies, and medical equipment companies. Once assigned, a provider's NPI is permanent and remains with the provider regardless of job or location changes.

Other health industry workers who provide support services but not health care (such as admissions and medical billing personnel, housekeeping staff, and orderlies) are not required to obtain an NPI.

== Optional uses ==
The NPI must be used in connection with the electronic transactions identified in HIPAA. In addition, the NPI may be used in several other ways:

1. by health care providers to identify themselves in health care transactions identified in HIPAA or on related correspondence;
2. by health care providers to identify other health care providers in health care transactions or on related correspondence;
3. by health care providers on prescriptions (however, the NPI will not replace requirements for the DEA number or state license number);
4. by health plans in their internal provider files to process transactions and communicate with health care providers;
5. by health plans to coordinate benefits with other health plans;
6. by health care clearinghouses in their internal files to create and process standard transactions and to communicate with health care providers and health plans;
7. by electronic patient record systems to identify treating health care providers in patient medical records;
8. by the Department of Health and Human Services to cross-reference health care providers in fraud and abuse files and other program integrity files;
9. for any other lawful activity requiring individual identification.

== Signup process ==
The NPI number can be obtained online through the National Plan and Provider Enumeration System (NPPES) pages on CMS's website. The turnaround time for obtaining a number is 1 to 20 days. NPI numbers can be searched on the CMS website, listed in the external links 'National Plan and Provider Enumeration System information from CMS.

== Identifier details ==
The NPI is a 10-position, intelligence-free numeric identifier (10-digit number). This means that the numbers do not carry other information about healthcare providers, such as the state in which they live or their medical specialty. The NPI must be used in lieu of legacy provider identifiers in HIPAA standards transactions. As outlined in the federal regulation, the Health Insurance Portability and Accountability Act of 1996 (HIPAA), covered providers must also share their NPI with other providers, health plans, clearinghouses, and any entity that may need it for billing purposes.

Ten-digit NPI numbers may be validated using the Luhn algorithm by prefixing "80840" to the 10-digit number.

== Open data set ==
NPI data is downloadable from CMS. The downloadable database was updated monthly until December 2012 and has been updated weekly since then. A data structure file is available separately from CMS. As of June 2024, the file download size is 947.84 MB, and the raw database file (npidata_pfile_20050523-20240512.csv) is 9.3 GB when extracted. The size of the data has been steadily growing over time. The size of the raw database file was 8.8GB in June 2023 and 8.2GB in June 2022.

== Use as a data key ==
The NPI is a data key that identifies a substantial portion of healthcare providers and other entities in the US. It is a frequently used data key in other data sources. For instance, the DocGraph data set is a crowdfunded open data set that details how healthcare providers collaborate to deliver care (i.e., referral patterns) that uses the NPI as its data key.

The NPI is often a common denominator between various healthcare provider identifier numbers, such as CMS Certification Number (CCN; formerly OSCAR number), Employer Identification Number, and PECOS Associate Control ID (PAC ID). As more publicly available datasets containing these identifiers become available, some organizations have extracted the most plausible links among them. For example, a crosswalk between CCN and NPI can be obtained by analyzing the facility ownership datasets. As another example, a subset of the crosswalk between EIN and NPI can be derived by analyzing the provider reference files from various payers.
