= Luhn algorithm =

Simple checksum formula

The Luhn algorithm or Luhn formula (creator: IBM scientist Hans Peter Luhn), also known as the "modulus 10" or "mod 10" algorithm, is a simple check digit formula used to validate a variety of identification numbers. (Note: It is described in US patent 2950048A, granted on 23 August 1960.) The purpose is to design a numbering scheme in such a way that when a human is entering a number, a computer can quickly check it for errors.

The algorithm is in the public domain and is in wide use today. It is specified in ISO/IEC 7812-1. It is not intended to be a cryptographically secure hash function; it was designed to protect against accidental errors, not malicious attacks. Most credit card numbers and many government identification numbers use the algorithm as a simple method of distinguishing valid numbers from mistyped or otherwise incorrect numbers.

== Description ==
The check digit is computed as follows:

1. Drop the check digit from the number (if it's already present). This leaves the payload.
2. Start with the payload digits and double every second digit (a digit in an odd position in reversed order) when numbered from the left.
3. Process the payload from right-to-left. If a doubled digit exceeds 9, subtract 9 from the digit.
4. Sum all the resulting digits (including the ones that were not doubled).
5. The check digit is calculated by $(10 - (s \bmod{10})) \bmod{10}$, where s is the sum from step 4. This is the smallest number (possibly zero) that must be added to $s$ to make a multiple of 10.
6. Other valid formulas giving the same value are $9 - ((s + 9)\bmod{10})$, $(10 - s)\bmod{10}$, and $10\lceil s/10\rceil - s$. Note that the formula $(10 - s)\bmod{10}$ will not work in all environments due to differences in how negative numbers are handled by the modulo operation.

=== Example for computing check digit ===
Assume an example of an account number 1789372997 (just the "payload", check digit not yet included):

| Digits reversed | 7 | 9 | 9 | 2 | 7 | 3 | 9 | 8 | 7 | 1 |
| Multipliers | 2 | 1 | 2 | 1 | 2 | 1 | 2 | 1 | 2 | 1 |
| | = | = | = | = | = | = | = | = | = | = |
| | 14 | 9 | 18 | 2 | 14 | 3 | 18 | 8 | 14 | 1 |
| Sum digits | 5 (1+4) | 9 | 9 (1+8) | 2 | 5 (1+4) | 3 | 9 (1+8) | 8 | 5 (1+4) | 1 |

The sum of the resulting digits is 56.

The check digit is equal to $(10 - (56 \bmod{10}))\bmod{10} = 4$.

This makes the full account number read 17893729974.

=== Example for validating check digit ===
1. Drop the check digit (last digit) of the number to validate. (e.g. 17893729974 → 1789372997)
2. Calculate the check digit (see above)
3. Compare your result with the original check digit. If both numbers match, the result is valid. (e.g. (givenCheckDigit = calculatedCheckDigit) ⇔ (isValidCheckDigit)).

== Strengths and weaknesses ==
The Luhn algorithm will detect all single-digit errors, as well as almost all transpositions of adjacent digits. It will not, however, detect transposition of the two-digit sequence 09 to 90 (or vice versa). It will detect most of the possible twin errors (it will not detect 22 ↔ 55, 33 ↔ 66 or 44 ↔ 77).

Other, more complex check-digit algorithms (such as the Verhoeff algorithm and the Damm algorithm) can detect more transcription errors. The Luhn mod N algorithm is an extension that supports non-numerical strings.

Because the algorithm operates on the digits in a right-to-left manner and zero digits affect the result only if they cause shift in position, zero-padding the beginning of a string of numbers does not affect the calculation. Therefore, systems that pad to a specific number of digits (by converting 1234 to 0001234 for instance) can perform Luhn validation before or after the padding and achieve the same result.

The algorithm appeared in a United States Patent for a simple, hand-held, mechanical device for computing the checksum. The device took the mod 10 sum by mechanical means. The substitution digits, that is, the results of the double and reduce procedure, were not produced mechanically. Rather, the digits were marked in their permuted order on the body of the machine.

== Pseudocode implementation ==
The following function takes a card number, including the check digit, as an array of integers and outputs true if the check digit is correct, false otherwise.

function isValid(cardNumber[1..length])
    sum := 0
    for i from 1 to length do
        digit := cardNumber[i]
        offsetFromEnd := length - i
        if (offsetFromEnd mod 2) == 1 then
            sum := sum + digit
        elseif digit < 5 then
            sum := sum + 2 * digit
        else
            sum := sum + 2 * digit - 9
        end if
    end for
    return (sum mod 10) == 0
end function

== Uses ==
The Luhn algorithm is used in a variety of systems, including:

- Credit card numbers
- IMEI numbers
- CUSIP numbers for North American financial instruments
- National Provider Identifier numbers in the United States
- Canadian social insurance numbers
- Israeli ID numbers
- South African ID numbers
- South African Tax reference numbers
- Swedish Personal identity numbers
- Swedish Corporate Identity Numbers (OrgNr)
- Greek Social Security Numbers (ΑΜΚΑ)
- ICCID of SIM cards
- European patent application numbers
- Survey codes appearing on McDonald's, Taco Bell, and Tractor Supply Co. receipts
- United States Postal Service package tracking numbers use a modified Luhn algorithm
- Italian VAT numbers (Partita Iva)

== In popular culture ==
In 1995, during a promotional event about buying movie tickets online, actress Sandra Bullock jokingly remarked that a verification system was needed to catch typos when entering credit card numbers. The video resurfaced online in 2026, amusing users who jokingly credited the actress with inventing "two-step verification", though the concept she suggested is closer to the Luhn algorithm, which had been devised back in 1954.
