= Indonesia Commodity and Derivatives Exchange =

Indonesian market exchange

Indonesia Commodity and Derivatives Exchange (ICDX) is a commodity exchange that provides facilities and infrastructure to its members to conduct prime commodity transactions. Like other exchanges, the ICDX enforces trade regulations to create a platform for fair and transparent transactions.

ICDX is global trading center for Indonesia's natural resources, including gold, crude oil, foreign exchange, crude palm oil (CPO) and tin. ICDX collaborates with PT Indonesia Clearing House (ICH) and PT ICDX Logistik Berikat (ILB). ICH is the guarantor institution for all transactions including risk management, margin, and transaction settlement. Meanwhile, ILB plays a role in physical transactions to eliminate country risk and also integrated logistics management system as end-to-end services.

== Subsidiaries ==
The subsidiaries of ICDX are as follows:

- Indonesia Clearing House is a business entity that organizes and provides a system as well as tools to conduct clearing and transaction guarantee activities in Futures Exchange and is established to support the presence of fair, efficient, and accountable Exchange Contract transaction in Futures Exchange in line with the mandate of Law No. 32/1997 on Commodity Futures Trade and Law No. 10/2011 on Amendment to Law No. 32/1997. ICH has responsibility over all clearing activities and settlements for physical and futures ICDX membership consists of traders, brokerage firms, and foreign traders (remote members). All members have to register into membership process, member fees, annual fees to active the trade transactions as the Exchange clearing members. ICDX are connect with Indonesia government regulations departments, also keeping change rules to their members. Cause many members prefer to not active their trades, and only put names on the list to pretend show their loyalty as members.
- PT ICDX Logistik Berikat was established as a support towards a package of Indonesian economic deregulation policy on Bonded Logistic Center. Through ICDX-ICH-ILB synergy, ILB serves collateral management, affordable warehouse facility up to three years, goods delivery service, warehouse management, custom clearance, warehouse receipt financing scheme, Warehouse Receipt System (EPACT) to support integrated business operational. ILB also support commodity shipment based on physical contract and futures contract traded at ICDX. ILB engaged in commodity storage in collaboration with the Indonesia Commodity & Derivatives Exchange (ICDX) and the Indonesia Clearing House (ICH). ILB provides storage facilities, commodity management, customs and other services.

== Products ==
- GOFX. GOFX is a group of futures products consisting of Gold, Oil & Forex. GOFX transactions are traded directly in a multilateral market in ICDX and are supervised by the Indonesian government through the Commodity Futures Trading Regulatory Agency (BAPPEBTI). Members can conduct transactions without interference from other parties in determining prices, resulting in a fair and safe trading environment. GOFX is also integrated with MetaTrader5 to provide access to the global market.
- Tin. Indonesia is the world's number one tin exporter and second as the largest tin producer. In 2013, ICDX launched the Indonesian Tin Market with tin contracts of TIN PB 300, TIN PB 200, TIN PB 100, TIN PB 50 and TIN 4NINE. Since then, tin transaction has grown rapidly as the export destination countries increased from 16 to 26 countries in just 6 years.
- CPO. Palm oil is the most widely used vegetable oil in the world and Indonesia is the world's number one Crude Palm Oil (CPO) producer. To accommodate CPO trade and exports, ICDX launched CPOTR contracts in 2010 as a benchmark price for CPO exporters in Indonesia.
- Sharia Commodity Market. Sharia Commodity is a commodity trading activity according to sharia principles carried out on the Commodity Exchange. Commodities traded must be of a known sort, quality, and amount, and permissible by laws and regulations. In practice, commodity trading on the Exchange is based on sharia principles in the form of purchase and sale commodity between Commodity Traders Participants and Islamic financial institution (Commercial Participants), and between Islamic financial institution (Commercial Participants) and Islamic financial institution customers (Commodity Consumers); and in the following sales, buying and selling are carried out between Islamic financial institution customers (Commodity Consumers) and Commodity Trader Participants.
- Carbon. The carbon traded under this mechanism is in the form of carbon credits, a certificate that represents the right to emit a certain amount of emissions. One carbon unit is equivalent to reducing emissions by 1 ton of carbon dioxide equivalent (CO2e). Purchasers of carbon credits are generally agencies that produce emissions above a specified limit in their industrial processes. above a specified limit in their industrial processes. While carbon credit sellers are agencies that can produce emissions below the limit or can reduce emissions from their industrial processes. reduce emissions from their industrial processes.
- Digital Gold. Digital gold is an emerging market and slowly become one of the investor favourite alternative for their investment plan. Connectivity of digital gold market player and ICDX ecosystem enable a more accessible and liquid market. ICDX complements the national gold market ecosystem by integrating with digital gold enterprises system to create a fair and organized market with comprehensive risk mitigation for digital gold investors.

== Membership ==
ICDX has a membership of 156 members, with 72% being foreign members and 28% being from Indonesia.

=== Trade members ===
Trade members can be a company or an individual who resides in the country or abroad. A company member can constitute 100% Indonesian and foreign ownership, while an individual member must be either an Indonesian or foreign citizen who has an Indonesian tax ID (NPWP). A clearinghouse member is only allowed to trade on behalf of his name and cannot ask and/or receive a mandate from other customers.

=== Broker members ===
Broker members can either be 100% Indonesia-owned or a maximum of 95% foreign-owned. A broker member that is a clearinghouse member is allowed to accept funds from other customers and be a third party for trading purpose. A broker member can also clear and guarantee all transactions. If a broker member is not from a clearinghouse, all transactions must be cleared by a broker who is a member of a clearinghouse.

== Timeline ==
- 2009. Indonesia Commodity & Derivatives Exchange (ICDX) established. Launch of GOLDGR Contract.
- 2010. CPOTR Futures Contract Launch as a benchmark price for CPO exporters in Indonesia.
- 2011. The launch of GOLDUD & GOLDID Delayed Contract to Handover Gold & OLEINTR Futures Contract
- 2012. The launch of Tin Physical Contract (INATIN) that marks the start of tin trading transaction through an exchange in Indonesia
- 2013. The launch of Bar Pure Tin Contract and the benchmark composition of the CPO export price of 60% uses the CPOTR ICDX contract price.
- 2014. The First Indonesian Tin Conference “Indonesia Tin Conference & Exhibition (ITCE) by ICDX” was held in Bangka.
- 2015. The launch of LTIN pure tin bar contract; The change of PT Identrust Security International to PT Indonesia Clearing House based on Decree of Head of CoFTRA No. 16/BAPPEBTI/SP-PN/04/2015.
- 2016. The launch of TSR20 Rubber Physical Contract Agreement (SIR/SMR/STR) by BAPPEBTI; Inauguration of the Regional Rubber Market in Asia between Thailand, Malaysia, Indonesia represented by ICDX.
- 2017. ICDX Logistik Berikat (ILB) officially operated; Indonesian tin transaction value reached the highest level at US$1.6 billion since being traded in the exchange.
- 2018. GOFX goes live; ICDX raised Indonesia's tin sovereignty by gradually reducing the volume of tin trade through Singapore from 80% to 24% this year.
- 2019. Launch GOFX Micro; Electronic Warehouse Receipt Trading Platform (EPACT) officially operates; The number of tin export destination increased from 26 to 36 countries this year.
- 2020. Launch of COFR, COFU10, COFU100 Contract; In its first week, almost 3,200 crude oil futures contracts were traded at ICDX. GOFX Micro Trading Class.
- 2021. ICDX officially becomes the exchange for the digital gold physical market, integrating with digital gold enterprises to create a fair and organized market for digital gold investors.
- 2022. ICDX as a Futures Exchange has obtained permission from the Commodity Futures Trading Supervisory Agency (CoFTRA) - Ministry of Trade to organize a sharia commodity murabahah market.
- 2023. ICDX received approval from the Commodity Futures Trading Supervisory Agency, operating under the Ministry of Trade's jurisdiction This endorsement acknowledged ICDX as Indonesia's designated exchange for Crude Palm Oil (CPO).
