= List of GS1 country codes =

Bar Code

This is a list of country codes used by GS1. Not to be confused with target-market-country-code.

Source: GS1 Company Prefix

Code	Country
001–019	UPC-A compatible - United States
020–029	UPC-A compatible - Used to issue restricted circulation numbers within a geographic region
030–039	UPC-A compatible - United States drugs (see United States National Drug Code)
040–049	UPC-A compatible - Used to issue restricted circulation numbers within a company
050–059	UPC-A compatible - GS1 US reserved for future use
060–099	UPC-A compatible - United States
100–139	United States
200–299	Used to issue GS1 restricted circulation number within a geographic region
300–379	France and Monaco
380	Bulgaria
381	Kosovo (Used to unofficially use 390 before joining GS1)
383	Slovenia
385	Croatia
387	Bosnia and Herzegovina
389	Montenegro
400–440	Germany (440 code inherited from former East Germany upon reunification in 1990)
450–459	Japan (new Japanese Article Number range)
460–469	Russia (barcodes inherited from the Soviet Union)
470	Kyrgyzstan
471	Taiwan
474	Estonia
475	Latvia
476	Azerbaijan
477	Lithuania
478	Uzbekistan
479	Sri Lanka
480	Philippines
481	Belarus
482	Ukraine
483	Turkmenistan
484	Moldova
485	Armenia
486	Georgia
487	Kazakhstan
488	Tajikistan
489	Hong Kong
490–499	Japan (original Japanese Article Number range)
500–509	United Kingdom
520–521	Greece
528	Lebanon
529	Cyprus
530	Albania
531	North Macedonia
535	Malta
539	Ireland
540–549	Belgium and Luxembourg
560	Portugal
569	Iceland
570–579	Denmark, Faroe Islands and Greenland
590	Poland
594	Romania
599	Hungary
600–601	South Africa
603	Ghana
604	Senegal
605	Uganda
606	Angola
607	Oman
608	Bahrain
609	Mauritius
611	Morocco
612	Somalia
613	Algeria
615	Nigeria
616	Kenya
617	Cameroon
618	Ivory Coast
619	Tunisia
620	Tanzania
621	Syria
622	Egypt
623	"Managed by GS1 Global Office for future MO" (was Brunei until May 2021)
624	Libya
625	Jordan
626	Iran
627	Kuwait
628	Saudi Arabia
629	United Arab Emirates
630	Qatar
631	Namibia
632	Rwanda
640–649	Finland
680–681	China
690–699	China
700–709	Norway
729	Israel
730–739	Sweden
740	Guatemala
741	El Salvador
742	Honduras
743	Nicaragua
744	Costa Rica
745	Panama
746	Dominican Republic
750	Mexico
754–755	Canada
759	Venezuela
760–769	Switzerland and Liechtenstein
770–771	Colombia
773	Uruguay
775	Peru
777	Bolivia
778–779	Argentina
780	Chile
784	Paraguay
786	Ecuador
789–790	Brazil
800–839	Italy, San Marino and Vatican City
840–849	Spain and Andorra
850	Cuba
858	Slovakia
859	Czech Republic (barcode inherited from Czechoslovakia)
860	Serbia (barcode inherited from Yugoslavia via Serbia and Montenegro)
865	Mongolia
867	North Korea
868–869	Turkey
870–879	Netherlands
880–881	South Korea
883	Myanmar
884	Cambodia
885	Thailand
887	Laos
888	Singapore
890	India
893	Vietnam
894	Bangladesh
896	Pakistan
899	Indonesia
900–919	Austria
930–939	Australia
940–949	New Zealand
950	GS1 Global Office: Used to support territories & countries where no GS1 Member Organisation operates
951	Used to issue General Manager Numbers for the EPC General Identifier (GID) scheme as defined by the EPC Tag Data Standard
952	Used for demonstrations and examples of the GS1 system
955	Malaysia
958	Macau
960–9624	GS1 UK Office: GTIN-8 allocations
9625–9626	GS1 Poland Office: GTIN-8 allocations
9627–969	GS1 Global Office: GTIN-8 allocations
977	Serial publications (ISSN)
978–979	"Bookland" (ISBN-13), 978 encompasses all older 10-digit ISBNs, 979-0 is used for sheet music ("Musicland", ISMN-13, replaces deprecated ISMN M- numbers)
980	Refund receipts
981–983	GS1 coupon identification for common currency areas
990–999	GS1 coupon identification

Note GS1 member companies can manufacture products anywhere in the world, and can license prefixes from the GS1 organisation of their choice. GS1 prefixes do not identify the country of origin for a given product.

GS1 prefixes not listed above are reserved by GS1 Global Office.

== See also ==
- List of ISBN registration groups
