= ZBar =

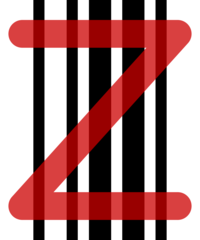

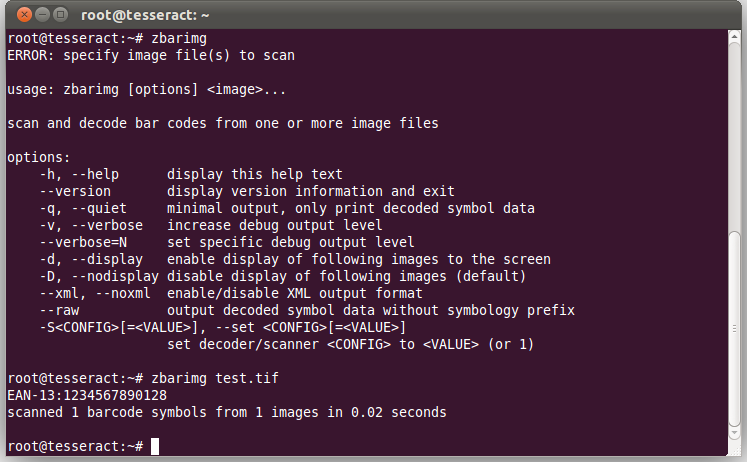
- Screenshot of ZBar
- Developer(s): ZBar developers
- Stable release: 0.23.93 / 9 January 2024; 19 months ago
- Repository: github.com/mchehab/zbar
- Written in: C
- Operating system: Cross-platform
- Type: Barcode reader
- License: GNU LGPL
- Website: git.linuxtv.org/zbar.git

ZBar is an open-source C barcode reading library with C++, Python, Perl, and Ruby bindings. It is also implemented on Linux and Microsoft Windows as a command-line application, and as an iPhone application.

It was originally developed at SourceForge. As the latest official release (version 0.10) was in 2009-10-27, a fork was created in March, 2017, converting it to use qt5 and libv4l, improving it to better support the Video4Linux API version 2.

== Features ==
- Image scanning
- Real-time scanning of video streams
- C++, Python, Perl, and Ruby bindings
- Qt, GTK+, and PyGTK GUI bindings
- Recognition of EAN-13, UPC-A, UPC-E, EAN-8, Code 128, Code 39, Interleaved 2 of 5 and QR code symbologies
