= DVD Profiler =

- DVD Profiler
- Developer: Invelos Software
- Stable release: 4.0.0 / September 16, 2017
- Operating system: Windows
- Type: Database
- Website: Invelos website

DVD Profiler is a program that allows users to catalogue their DVD collections. The program was created by Ken Cole at InterVocative Software. Although it can be used for free (with free registration), it can be upgraded to a premium registration for a one-time fee. Registration allows users to download higher-resolution cover scans, to vote on all changes to the DVD database, and to use the newest beta versions of the software.

DVD Profiler permits the adding of DVDs (since V3.0, HD DVDs and Blu-ray Discs, since V4.0 Ultra HD Blu-rays) by entering the UPC/EAN, inserting the disc itself into the computer's DVD drive or searching by title. Users can upload their collection to the internet to provide other users the possibility to view their DVD profiles.

Also available is DVD Profiler Mobile, which allows the user to access your DVD Profiler database via a Pocket PC. You can also make changes to your database directly in DVD Profiler Mobile and synchronize back to your main DVD Profiler database.

Since December 2010 there's also an app for iPhone and iPad available which works as a standalone product or in combination with the Desktop version.

As of May 17, 2013, a version for Android has been released.

Up through version 2.4 the program was released and maintained by InterVocative Software. Version 3.0 is released and maintained by Invelos Software, a company set up by developer Ken Cole to focus entirely on DVD Profiler and related products & services.

A major drawback is the lack of support for Unicode, which makes it impossible to enter Asian DVD titles correctly. Another drawback is that after years of fully functional ad-supported versions, from version 3.0 onwards, users cannot use most features with collections over 50 discs without buying the software. In January 2026 the software website has been unresponsive. The software may have reached its end of life.

== Legal issues ==
On April 5, 2007, Jesse Slicer, Kenneth Meade, and InterVocative Software, LLC (represented by Tim Haverty) filed an injunction (Case # 07CY-CV03512) in Missouri's 7th Judicial District (Clay County) against Ken Cole and Invelos, LLC (represented by Joseph Gall). Judge Anthony Gabbert presided.

On May 9, 2007 the issue was resolved to the satisfaction of both companies, and InterVocative Software became a wholly owned subsidiary of Invelos Software, Inc.

== Versions ==
DVD Profiler
Version	Build	Size	Release date
0.9.7			February 11, 2000
1.0.0			July 6, 2000
1.0.1			August 15, 2000
1.0.2			August 23, 2000
1.1.0			March 22, 2001
2.0.0			September 10, 2002
2.1.0			February 11, 2003
2.2.0			November 11, 2003
2.3.0			December 10, 2004
2.3.1			December 2004
2.4.0	868	3.9M	June 20, 2005
2.5.0	915	4.0M	November 17, 2005
3.0.0	1090	8.2M	March 12, 2007
3.0.1	1104	8.2M	March 18, 2007
3.0.2	1124	8.2M	March 31, 2007
3.0.3	1136	8.2M	May 28, 2007
3.1.0	1151	8.2M	September 4, 2007
3.1.1	1171	8.5M	October 8, 2007
3.5.0	1240		November 15, 2008
3.5.1	1252		December 30, 2008
3.6.0			March 26, 2010
3.6.1	1392		April 3, 2010
3.7.0	1426		December 10, 2010
3.7.1			December 22, 2010
3.7.2	1444		February 4, 2011
3.8.0	1499		May 26, 2012
3.8.1	1522	11.3M	June 15, 2012
3.8.2	1542	11.4M	November 26, 2012
3.9.0	1596	12.2M	January 27, 2015
3.9.1	1657	12.2M	April 24, 2015
4.0.0	1762	12.6M	September 16, 2017

DVD Profiler for Android
Version	Android	Size	Release date
1.0.0	2.3 or later	5.8M	May 16, 2013
1.0.1	2.3 or later	5.8M	November 11, 2013
1.1.0	2.3 or later		September 26, 2014
1.1.3	2.3 or later	6.0M	September 30, 2014
1.2.0	2.3 or later		April 16, 2015
1.2.4	2.3 or later	6.6M	July 10, 2015
4.0.0	2.3 or later		September 20, 2017

DVD Profiler for iOS
Version	iOS	Size	Release date
1.0.0	3.1.3 or later	4.7M	December 16, 2010
1.0.1	3.1.3 or later		December 23, 2010
1.1.0	3.1.3 or later		February 4, 2011
1.1.1	3.1.3 or later		February 8, 2011
1.1.2	3.1.3 or later		February 18, 2011
1.1.3	3.1.3 or later	4.9M	March 7, 2011
2.0.0	4.3 or later		November 28, 2012
2.0.1	4.3 or later		December 7, 2012
2.0.2	4.3 or later		January 8, 2013
2.1.3			October 8, 2014
2.1.4			October 10, 2014
2.1.5			October 14, 2014
2.1.6	6.0 or later	10.3M	March 9, 2015
4.0.0	8.0 or later		September 16, 2017
4.0.1	8.0 or later		September 21, 2017
4.0.2	8.0 or later		December 12, 2017
4.0.3	8.0 or later		December 15, 2017
4.0.4	8.0 or later	22.4M	January 8, 2018

DVD Profiler Mobile (End of Life)
Version	Build	Size	Release date
1.0.0	114	5.9M	March 12, 2007
1.0.1	115	5.9M	March 20, 2007
1.0.3	118	5.9M	April 2, 2007
1.0.4	119	5.9M	May 28, 2007
1.1.0	122	5.9M	September 5, 2007
1.2.0	126	5.9M	November 15, 2008
1.3.0	142	5.9M	March 26, 2010
