= GEPIR =

Defunct international company database operated by GS1

GEPIR (Global Electronic Party Information Registry) was a distributed database operated and owned by GS1 that contains basic information on over 1,000,000 companies in over 100 countries. The database could be searched by Global Trade Item Number (GTIN) code (including Universal Product Code (UPC) and EAN-13 codes), container Code (Serial Shipping Container Code (SSCC)), location number (Global Location Number (GLN)), and (in some countries) the company name. A SOAP webservice existed for API access. As of end December 2023, GEPIR was replaced by a service called Verified by GS1.

While it operated, GEPIR had more than 1 million members in more than 100 countries. In 2013, all GS1 111 member organisations joined GEPIR.

== Access ==
GEPIR was accessible for free in almost all countries but the number of request per day was limited (from 20 to 30). Since October 2013, GS1 France restricts access to GEPIR to companies (registration with SIREN code was required to use it).

A premium access service had been created by GS1 France in January 2010 which allows companies to use GS1 web and SOAP interface without any limit.

== System architecture ==
GEPIR was a lookup service coordinated by the GS1 GO that provided all end users with the ability to look up information about GS1 Identification Keys.

Depending on the service, systems were provided by GS1 Member Organisations (MOs) or 3rd party service providers, or both. Where a GS1 MO did not choose to provide the service directly to its end users, the GS1 Global Office provided the service for that geography. Some services involved a technical component deployed by the GS1 Global Office that coordinates the systems provided by GS1 MOs and/or 3rd party service providers.

The GEPIR service was provided by systems deployed by GS1 MOs, with the GS1 GO providing a central point of coordination to federate the local systems. The GS1 GO also provides the MO-level service for MOs that could not or did not wish to deploy their own system.
