= Bernard Silver =

American engineer and inventor (1924–1963)

- Born: September 21, 1924
- Died: August 28, 1963 (aged 38); Pennsylvania, United States
- Burial place: Roosevelt Memorial Park, Trevose, Bucks County, Pennsylvania
- Education: Drexel University (BSc)
- Occupation: Engineer
- Known for: Co-inventor of the barcode
- Spouse: Phyllis Silver
- Children: Barry; Ronald
- Honours: National Inventors Hall of Fame inductee (2011)

Bernard Silver (September 21, 1924 – August 28, 1963) was an American electrical engineer who co-invented the barcode alongside Norman Joseph Woodland.

Silver earned his Bachelor of Science in Electrical Engineering from the Drexel Institute of Technology in 1947. In 1948, Bernard Silver, a Drexel Institute graduate student, overheard a supermarket executive asking the dean of engineering if the Institute could determine how to capture product information automatically at checkout. The dean turned down the request, but Silver was interested enough to mention the problem to Woodland. After working on some preliminary ideas, Woodland was persuaded that they could create a viable product.

In 1948 Silver paired with Norman Joseph Woodland to come up with an automated way to read product data after overhearing the conversation of a local grocery store president. Their initial results, a system of lines and circles based on Morse code, was replaced with a bulls eye pattern so it could be scanned from any direction. Silver and Woodland filed a patent for their system on October 20, 1949. U.S. patent 2,612,994 was granted on October 7, 1952. "The two men eventually sold their patent to Philco for $15,000 — all they ever made from their invention."

During his career Silver served as a physics instructor at Drexel and as vice-president of Electro Nite Inc. He died August 28, 1963, of bronchopneumonia due to acute myelogenous leukemia at the age of 38. In 2011 Silver, alongside Woodland, was inducted into the National Inventors Hall of Fame.

Google featured a doodle of their logo as a barcode to recognize the anniversary of Bernard Silver at October 7, 2009.

== See also ==
- George Laurer
