= Bookland (disambiguation) =

Bookland can refer to:

- Bookland, a fictitious location corresponding to a 978 prefix that converts a 10 digit ISBN into EAN-13 barcode (with checksum changes).
- Bookland (law), a category of land in Anglo-Saxon law
- "Bookland", a chain of small-format book stores owned by American retailer Books-A-Million
