= Publisher Item Identifier =

Unique character string used to identify a scientific paper or a book

The Publisher Item Identifier (PII) is a unique identifier used by several scientific journal publishers to identify documents. It uses the pre-existing ISSN or ISBN of the publication in question, and adds a character for source publication type, an item number, and a check digit.

The system was adopted in 1996 by the American Chemical Society, the American Institute of Physics, the American Physical Society, Elsevier Science, and the IEEE.

== Format ==
A PII (pii) is a 17-character string, consisting of:

- one character to indicate source publication type: "S" = serial with ISSN, "B" = book with ISBN
- ISSN (8 digits) or ISBN (10 characters) of the serial or book to which the publication item is primarily assigned
- in the case of serials, an additional two-digit number to pad the difference between the 8-digit ISSN and an ISBN (suggested are the last two digits of the calendar year of the date of assignment, which is not necessarily identical to the cover date)
- a 5-digit number assigned by the publisher that is unique to the publication item within the serial or book
- a check digit (0-9 or X)

When a PII is printed (as opposed to stored in a database), the 17-character string may be extended with punctuation characters to make it more readable to humans, as in Sxxxx-xxxx(yy)iiiii-d or Bx-xxx-xxxxx-x/iiiii-d.

== Example ==
The PII S0960-894X(96)00515-X can be broken down as, where

- S – Indicates the publication is a serial, not a book
- 0960-894X – ISSN 0960-894X for the publication Bioorganic & Medicinal Chemistry Letters
- 96 – Padding/Year Code (1996)
- 00515 – Publisher's internal number
- X – Check digit

The above example is the PII for a scientific paper by Silvie Géhanne et al. (1996):

- Géhanne, Sylvie; Piga, Elisabetta; Andreotti, Daniele; Biondi, Stefano; Pizzi, Domenica (1996). "Synthesis and antibacterial, activity of 4-ureido trinems". Bioorganic & Medicinal Chemistry Letters. 6 (22): 2791–2794. doi:10.1016/S0960-894X(96)00515-X.

=== DOI ===
PII codes can be used as the item ID in a DOI identifier. In the previous example, the number 10.1016 is the DOI's publisher ID (Elsevier), a slash acts as a separator, followed by the PII code S0960-894X(96)00515-X.

== See also ==
- Serial Item and Contribution Identifier (SICI)
- Digital Object Identifier (DOI)
- OpenURL
