= Zbar =

Zbar may refer to:

- the ZBar barcode software library
- China's Alxa Right Banner Badanjilin Airport (ICAO code ZBAR)
- Adam Zbar, an American CEO
- Z with stroke, or "Z bar"
