= BICI =

BICI can refer to:

- Bahrain Independent Commission of Inquiry, a delegation established by the King of Bahrain on 29 June 2011 tasked with looking into the incidents that occurred during the period of unrest in Bahrain in February and March 2011 and the consequences of these events.
- Banque Internationale pour le Commerce et l'Industrie, a former African banking network.
- Book Item and Component Identifier, a draft standard of the United States National Information Standards Organization (NISO) that would provide a unique identifier for items or components within a book or publication to which an ISBN has been assigned.
