= Global Trade Item Number =

Identifier for trade items

The Global Trade Item Number (GTIN) is an identifier for trade items, developed by the international organization GS1. Such identifiers are used to look up product information in a database (often by entering the number through a barcode scanner pointed at an actual product) which may belong to a retailer, manufacturer, collector, researcher, or other entity. The uniqueness and universality of the identifier is useful in establishing which product in one database corresponds to which product in another database, especially across organizational boundaries.

== Format and incorporated standards ==
The GTIN standard has incorporated the International Standard Book Number (ISBN), International Standard Serial Number (ISSN), International Standard Music Number (ISMN), International Article Number (which includes the European Article Number and Japanese Article Number) and some Universal Product Codes (UPCs), into a universal number space.

GTINs may be eight, 12, 13, or 14 digits long, and each of these four numbering structures are constructed in a similar fashion, combining Company Prefix, Item Reference and a calculated Check Digit (GTIN-14 adds another component- the Indicator Digit, which can be 0–9). GTIN-8s will be encoded in an EAN-8 barcode. GTIN-12s may be shown in UPC-A, ITF-14, or GS1-128 barcodes. GTIN-13s may be encoded in EAN-13, ITF-14 or GS1-128 barcodes, and GTIN-14s may be encoded in ITF-14 or GS1-128 barcodes. The choice of barcode will depend on the application; for example, items to be sold at a retail establishment could be marked with EAN-8, EAN-13, UPC-A or UPC-E barcodes.

The EAN-8 code is an eight-digit barcode used usually for very small articles, such as chewing gum, where fitting a larger code onto the item would be difficult. Note: the equivalent UPC small format barcode, UPC-E, encodes a GTIN-12 with a special Company Prefix that allows for "zero suppression" of four zeros in the GTIN-12. The GS1 encoding and decoding rules state that the entire GTIN-12 is used for encoding and that the entire GTIN-12 is to be delivered when scanned.

== Format and encodings ==
Name	Former names	Barcode symbologies
GTIN-14 (used for wholesale shipments, not retail point of sale)	EAN/UCC-14, SCC-14, DUN-14, UPC Case Code, UPC Shipping Container Code	GS1-128, GS1 Databar, ITF-14
GTIN-13	EAN, EAN·UCC-13, JAN (subset)	EAN-13
GTIN-12	EAN·UCC-12, UCC-12	UPC-A, UPC-E (condensed to 6 digits)
GTIN-8	EAN/UCC-8	EAN-8

Number system	GTIN format													
Position of digits	T_{1}	T_{2}	T_{3}	T_{4}	T_{5}	T_{6}	T_{7}	T_{8}	T_{9}	T_{10}	T_{11}	T_{12}	T_{13}	T_{14}
GTIN-14	N_{1}	N_{2}	N_{3}	N_{4}	N_{5}	N_{6}	N_{7}	N_{8}	N_{9}	N_{10}	N_{11}	N_{12}	N_{13}	N_{14}
GTIN-13	0	N_{1}	N_{2}	N_{3}	N_{4}	N_{5}	N_{6}	N_{7}	N_{8}	N_{9}	N_{10}	N_{11}	N_{12}	N_{13}
GTIN-12	0	0	N_{1}	N_{2}	N_{3}	N_{4}	N_{5}	N_{6}	N_{7}	N_{8}	N_{9}	N_{10}	N_{11}	N_{12}
GTIN-8	0	0	0	0	0	0	N_{1}	N_{2}	N_{3}	N_{4}	N_{5}	N_{6}	N_{7}	N_{8}

The numbering structure is as follows:

- T1 – Indicator digit, used for GTIN-14, "1" to "8" indicates a packaging level and "9" a variable measure item. There is, however, no worldwide consensus on which number indicates which packaging level and no significance should be built into this number. Zero in this position is not considered a valid value.
- T2 through T13 GS1 Company Prefix & Item (product or service) reference number. The GS1 Company Prefix is allocated to the member company and the Item Reference is allocated by the user company. Each of these elements varies in length depending on the length of the allocated GS1 Company Prefix. Each different type of trade item is allocated a different number and, for ease of administration, it is recommended that companies do this sequentially (001, 002, 003, etc.).
- T14 is a check digit, which follows the standard modulo 10 calculation.

Note that GTIN-12 numbers can be encoded as GTIN-13 by adding a padding zero in the T2 position. Likewise, a GTIN-13 can be retrieved from a GTIN-14 by removing the T1 digit.

All books and serial publications sold internationally (including those in U.S. stores) have GTIN (GTIN-13) codes. The book codes are either constructed by prefixing the old 10-digit ISBN with 978, and recalculating the trailing check digit, or from 1 January 2007 issued as thirteen digits starting with 978 (eventually 979 as the 978 ranges are used up).

Each type of trade item is given its own GTIN, with the understanding that there is a potential need to retrieve predefined information from such items; this product or service may be priced, ordered, or invoiced at any point in the supply chain. This includes individual items as well as all of their different packaging configurations.

== See also ==
- Amazon Standard Identification Number (ASIN)
- Global Electronic Party Information Register (GEPIR), a searchable distributed database of GS1 codes
- List of GS1 country codes
- Part number
