= Norman Joseph Woodland =

American engineer and inventor (1921–2012)

- Woodland at IBM
- Born: September 6, 1921; Atlantic City, New Jersey, US
- Died: December 9, 2012 (aged 91); Edgewater, New Jersey, US
- Education: Drexel University (BSc)
- Occupation: Engineer
- Known for: Co-inventor of the barcode

Norman Joseph Woodland (September 6, 1921 – December 9, 2012) was an American Jewish inventor and engineer, best known as one of the inventors of the barcode, for which he received a patent in October 1952. Later, employed by IBM, he developed the format which became the ubiquitous Universal Product Code (UPC) of product labeling and check-out stands.

== Early life and career ==
Woodland was born in Atlantic City, New Jersey, on September 6, 1921, the elder of two boys in his family.

After graduating from Atlantic City High School, Woodland did military service in World War II as a technical assistant with the Manhattan Project in Oak Ridge, Tennessee. Woodland went on to earn his Bachelor of Science in Mechanical Engineering (BSME) from Drexel University (then called Drexel Institute of Technology) in 1947. From 1948 to 1949, he worked as a lecturer in mechanical engineering at Drexel.

== Developing the bar code ==
In 1948, Bernard Silver, a fellow Drexel Institute graduate student with Woodland, overheard a supermarket executive asking the dean of engineering if the Institute could determine how to capture product information automatically at checkout. The dean turned down the request, but Silver was interested enough to mention the problem to Woodland. After working on some preliminary ideas, Woodland was persuaded that they could create a viable product.

Woodland took some stock market earnings, quit his teaching job and moved to his grandfather's Florida apartment. While at the beach, Woodland again considered the problem, recalling, from his Boy Scout training, how Morse code dots and dashes are used to send information electronically. He drew dots and dashes in the sand similar to the shapes used in Morse code. After pulling them downward with his fingers, producing thin lines resulting from the dots and thick lines from the dashes, he came up with the concept of a two-dimensional, linear Morse code, and after sharing it with Silver and adapting optical sound film technology, they applied for a patent on October 20, 1949, receiving U.S. patent 2,612,994 Classifying Apparatus and Method on October 7, 1952, covering both linear barcode and circular bulls-eye printing designs.

Woodland was employed by IBM in 1951, and although Woodland and Silver wanted IBM to develop the technology, it wasn't commercially feasible, so they sold the patent in 1952 for $15,000 to Philco, which sold it to RCA later in 1952. RCA went on to attempt to develop commercial applications through the 1960s until the patent expired in 1969.

After RCA interested the National Association of Food Chains in 1969 in the idea, and they formed the U.S. Supermarket Ad Hoc Committee on a Uniform Grocery Product Code, rival IBM became involved in 1971, finding out about Woodland's work and transferring him to their North Carolina facilities, where he played a key role in developing the most important version of the technology, the Universal Product Code (UPC), beating RCA in a competition.

The first item scanned was a packet of chewing gum in an Ohio supermarket in 1974.

== Death ==
Woodland died from the effects of Alzheimer's disease on December 9, 2012, in Edgewater, New Jersey.

== Awards ==
- In 1973, IBM presented Woodland with their Outstanding Contribution Award.
- In 1992, Woodland was awarded the National Medal of Technology from President George H. W. Bush for his contribution to barcode technology.
- In 1998, Woodland received an honorary degree from his alma mater, Drexel University.
- In 2011, Woodland was inducted into the National Inventors Hall of Fame.

== See also ==
- George Laurer
- QR code
