= Serial Item and Contribution Identifier =

Standard identifier for serial publications

The Serial Item and Contribution Identifier (SICI) was a code (ANSI/NISO standard Z39.56-1996 [R2002]) used to uniquely identify specific volumes, articles or other identifiable parts of a serial. It was "intended primarily for use by those members of the bibliographic community involved in the use or management of serial titles and their contributions". Developed over 1993–1995, NISO adopted SICI as a standard in 1996, then reaffirmed it in 2002. It was withdrawn in 2012.

== Description ==
It is an extension of the International Standard Serial Number, which identifies an entire serial (similar to the way an ISBN identifies a specific book). The ISSN applies to the entire publication, however, including every volume ever printed, so this more specific identifier was developed by the Serials Industry Systems Advisory Committee (SISAC) to allow references to specific parts of a journal.

The variable-length, free of charge, code is compatible with other identifiers, such as DOI, PII and URN. Prior to January 2009, SICIs were valid DOI suffixes for registration at the Crossref registration agency. However, to accommodate a security problem with Microsoft's Internet Explorer, they decided that they would soon refuse to register DOI suffixes that contain the colon character.

The SICI is a recognized international standard and is in wide use by publishers and the bibliographic community, primarily as an aid to finding existing articles or issues. JSTOR adopted SICIs in 2001 as its primary article-level identifier and the core of its stable and citation-derivable URLs. SICI was selected over simpler alternatives because of its ability to encompass the many varieties of journal metadata found in JSTOR's archive. However, due to difficulties encountered by its partners in calculating the correct values for the title code and the check digit, JSTOR's implementation of the standard ignores those elements. JSTOR now recommends against using SICI, and instead strongly suggests using DOIs instead. This is also done because sometimes multiple articles on the same page have exactly the same name (in particular "Obituary").

== Details ==
The SICI code is composed of three segments, intended to be both human-readable and easy for machines to parse automatically. The following example SICI is explained below:

Item
Abstract from Lynch, Clifford A. "The Integrity of Digital Information; Mechanics and Definitional Issues." JASIS 45:10 (Dec. 1994) p. 737-44
SICI
0002-8231(199412)45:10<737:TIODIM>2.3.TX;2-M

=== Item segment ===
0002-8231
This is the ISSN for the serial, in this case the Journal of the American Society for Information Science
(199412)
The chronology part is in parentheses and identifies the date of publication. In this case, it is signified by year and month; 1994 December
45:10
The enumeration part signifies the volume and number; Vol. 45, no. 10.

=== Contribution segment ===
<
Signifies the start of the contribution segment
737
Location code: signifies the page number, frame number, reel number, etc. In this case, page 737
TIODIM
Title code: based on the title of the article. In this case, an initialism: "The Integrity of Digital Information; Mechanics and Definitional Issues".
>
Signifies the end of the contribution segment

=== Control segment ===
2
Code Structure Identifier (CSI) for the type of SICI being constructed
3
Derivative Part Identifier (DPI) identifies a part of the contribution, such as a table of contents or abstract
TX
Format identifier two-letter code signifying the way content is presented. In this case, TX = printed text
2-
Standard version number
M
Check character allows a computer to detect errors in the code, similar to ISBN's check digit

== Examples ==
Item
Bjorner, Susanne. "Who Are These Independent Information Brokers?" Bulletin of the American Society for Information Science, Feb-Mar. 1995, Vol. 21, no. 3, page 12
SICI
0095-4403(199502/03)21:3<12:WATIIB>2.0.TX;2-J

=== Information ===
To use as an info URI, the SICI is percent-encoded and prefixed.

INFO
info:sici/1046-8188(199501)13:1%3C69:FTTHBI%3E2.0.TX;2-4

=== URN ===
To use in a URN, the SICI is percent-encoded and prefixed. For example, to create a URN for a specific article "From text to hypertext by indexing" in the journal ACM Transactions on Information Systems:

SICI
1046-8188(199501)13:1<69:FTTHBI>2.0.TX;2-4
URN
URN:SICI:1046-8188(199501)13:1%3C69:FTTHBI%3E2.0.TX;2-4

This could then be used to refer to the article inside an HTML citation (in the <cite> element), for instance, in a way that is superior to an HTTP link for documents that are not on the web or have transient URLs:

A model is presented for converting a collection of documents to hypertext by means of indexing. The documents are assumed to be semistructured, i.e., their text is a hierarchy of parts, and some of the parts consist of natural language. The model is intended as a framework for specifying hypertextual reading capabilities for specific application areas and for developing new automated tools for the conversion of semistructured text to hypertext.

An Internet Draft proposal to officially register the SICI namespace for URNs with IANA was made in 2002, but is currently dormant.

=== DOI ===
SICI codes can be used as the item ID in a DOI identifier. In the following example, the number 10.1002 is the DOI's publisher ID, a slash acts as a separator, and the rest, which is publisher-specific, is the SICI code:

- 10.1002/0002-8231(199601)47:1<23:TDOMII>2.0.TX;2-2

CrossRef no longer allows DOIs with colons to be registered, greatly reducing the usefulness of such SICIs.

== Revisions ==
- (ANSI/NISO standard Z39.56-1991)
- ANSI/NISO standard Z39.56-1996
- ANSI/NISO standard Z39.56-1996 [R2002] (Version 2)

== See also ==
- The BICI is a draft with a very similar format and functionality, using an ISBN instead of an ISSN, used to identify components of a book.
- ISSN
- DOI
- NISO
- OpenURL – tries to solve similar problems like SICI
- Z39.50
