= Serial (publishing) =

Literary or other works with same title issued in successive parts

In publishing and library and information science, the term serial is applied to materials "in any medium issued under the same title in a succession of discrete parts, usually numbered (or dated) and appearing at regular or irregular intervals with no predetermined conclusion."

This includes the literary serial, where a story is published in several parts, but also all kinds of periodicals such as magazines and journals.

== Periodicals ==
Periodicals are publications that are issued on a regular basis. Some of the examples of periodicals are weekly magazines, journals, Trade publications and newspapers. Each type of periodicals has its own characteristics and purpose.

In contrast to serials in general, a periodical has been defined as "A serial publication with its own distinctive title, containing a mix of articles ... by more than one contributor, issued ... at regular stated intervals of less than a year, without prior decision as to when the final issue will appear." Thus a periodical does not admit irregularly spaced publication times. This includes magazines and journals, but not proceedings. Thus all periodicals are serials but not all serials are periodicals.

== See also ==
- Academic publishing
- Book series
- Collection (publishing)
- International Standard Serial Number
- ISO 4
- Monographic series
- Serial Item and Contribution Identifier
- Serials crisis
