= National drug code =

Product identifier for drugs in the US

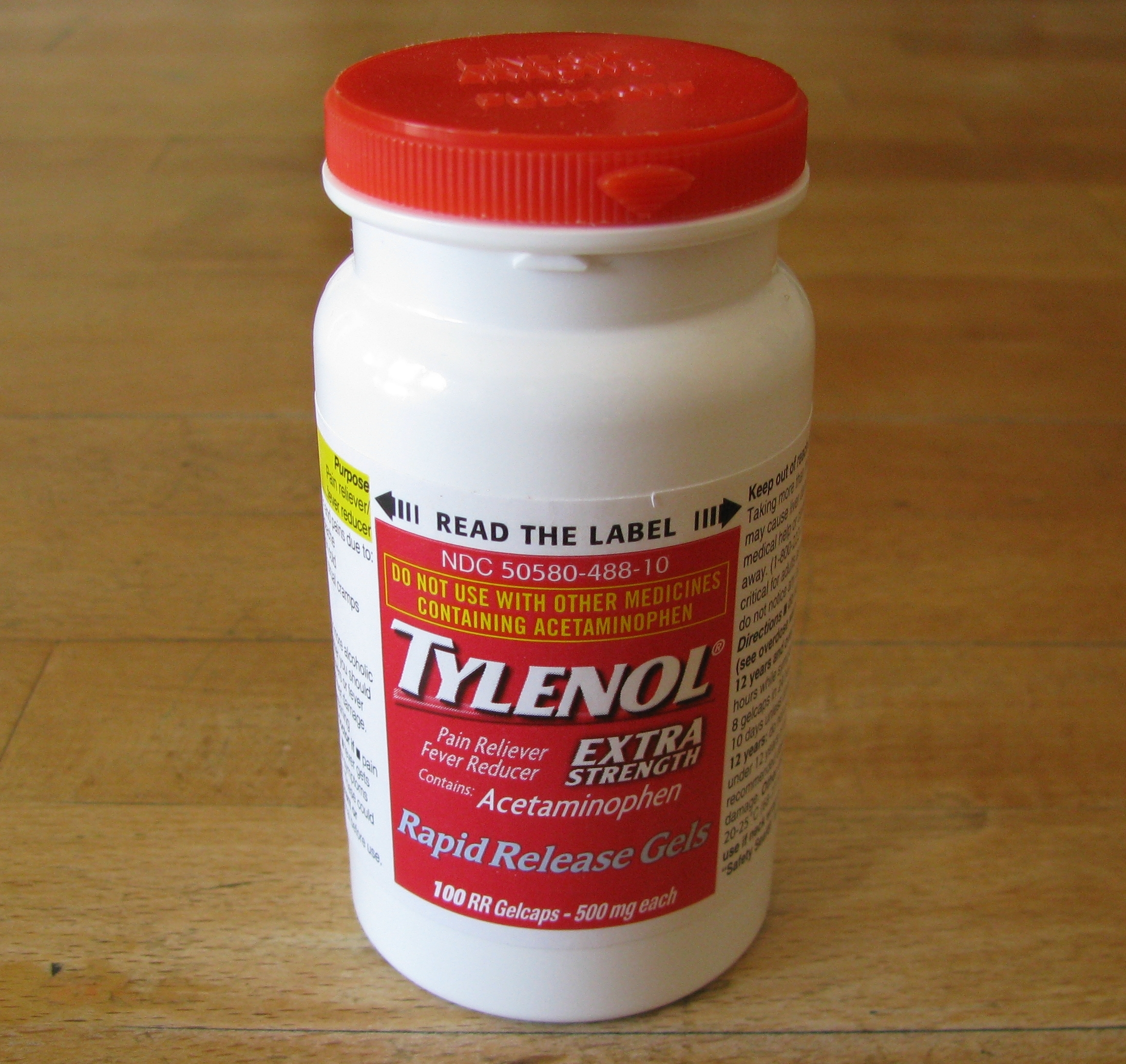
A bottle of Tylenol capsules labeled with the NDC "50580-488-10"

The national drug code (NDC) is a unique product identifier used in the United States for labeling prescription and over-the-counter drugs. The Drug Listing Act of 1972 requires registered drug establishments to provide the Food and Drug Administration (FDA) with a current list of all drugs manufactured, prepared, propagated, compounded, or processed by it for commercial distribution. Drug products are identified and reported using the NDC.

There are several alternative drug classification systems in addition to NDC that are also commonly used when analyzing drug data, such as Generic Product Identifier (GPI).

== Format ==
The national drug code is a unique 10 or 11 digit, 3-segment numeric identifier assigned to each medication listed under Section 510 of the US Federal Food, Drug, and Cosmetic Act. The segments identify the labeler or vendor, product (within the scope of the labeler), and trade package (of this product).

- The first segment, the labeler code, is 4, 5 or 6 digits long and assigned by the Food and Drug Administration (FDA) upon submission of a Labeler Code Request. A labeler is any firm that manufactures, repacks or distributes a drug product.
- The second segment, the product code, is 3 or 4 digits long and identifies a specific strength, dosage form, and formulation for a particular firm.
- The third segment, the package code, is 1 or 2 digits long and identifies package forms and sizes. In very exceptional cases, product and package segments may have contained characters other than digits.

While the labeler code is assigned by the FDA, both the product and package segments are assigned by the labeler. While in the past labelers may have had the opportunity to reassign old product codes no longer used to new products, according to the new FDA validation procedures, once an NDC code is assigned to one product (defined by key properties including active ingredients, strength, and dosage form) it may not be later reassigned to a different product.

NDC codes exist in one of the following groupings of digits into segments: 4-4-2, 5-3-2, 5-4-1, 6-3-2, or 6-4-1.

The following NDC structure rules apply depending on the length of certain segments. These rules include the 11 digit format. Unless stated otherwise, search for drug codes using the 10 digit format.

- If a labeler code is either 5 or 6 digits in length, it may be combined with:
  - A product code consisting of 4 digits and a package code consisting of 1 digit for a total NDC length of 10 or 11 digits (5-4-1 or 6-4-1), or
  - A product code consisting of 3 digits and a package code consisting of 2 digits for a total NDC length of 10 or 11 digits (5-3-2 or 6-3-2).
- If a labeler code is 4 digits in length, it may be combined only with a product code consisting of 4 digits and a package code consisting of 2 digits for a total NDC length of 10 digits (4-4-2).
- A registrant or private label distributor with a given labeler code must use only one Product-Package Code configuration (e.g., a 3-digit product code combined with a 2-digit package code or a 4-digit product code combined with a 1-digit package code).

The official FDA format for NDCs separates the 3 segments with dashes. This is the format in which the NDC must be submitted by labelers since mandatory electronic listing was established in June 2009.

While the NDC is a 10-digit identifier, confusion exists because of a proliferation of different notations and variants.

The previous NDC directory, populated by a paper-based listing system, sometimes inserted an asterisk in either a product code or a package code in addition to the dashes. This format is easily transformed to the official format in effect today by deleting the asterisk (if any).

Each NDC-coded product package in the US bears a barcode with a Universal Product Code that begins with a 3 (UPC-A) or 03 (EAN-13). The remainder of the numbers can be the 10 NDC digits, plus the check digit, but this is not required. If the NDC is used in the UPC it is the most minimal form of the NDC code with 10 digits only. Because the NDC code has been linked with product barcodes in this way, the NDC code could contain ambiguities in this form. For example, 1234-5678-90, 12345-678-90, and 12345-6789-0 could all be entirely different products with the same barcode 1234567890. To prevent any actual ambiguity from impacting the marketplace, ambiguity checks are part of the new electronic listing process.

The pure 10-digit NDC format cannot be transformed back into the standard format with dashes without the help of the product listing database.

The Centers for Medicare and Medicaid Services (CMS) had created an 11-digit NDC derivative, which pads the labeler, product, or package code segments of the NDC with leading zeroes wherever they are needed to result in a fixed length 5-4-2 configuration (but always written without dashes). This format was adopted by data standards selected pursuant to HIPAA regulation, thus other government agencies' lists and databases (such as the UMLS) may contain the 11-digit derivative of the original NDC.

The 11-digit NDC format cannot be transformed back into the 10-digit standard format without the help of a product listing database.

In some applications, the fully expanded 5+4 digit labeler+product code is used as a 9-digit number to identify a product regardless of packaging. Thus an 11-digit NDC can be transformed into a 9-digit NDC product code by removing the last two digits. This does not work reliably for 10-digit NDCs where the packaging code might be one digit and not two.

In 2022, the FDA proposed revising the NDC regulations to require use of a uniform 12-digit NDC with the same three functional segments but with uniform segment lengths of 6, 4, and 2 digits.
