= Lebanese ISBN Agency =

Details of an ISBN

Lebanese ISBN Agency is an agency responsible for assigning ISBN numbers for the group identifier 9953 to books in Lebanon. As of 2011 the agency is part of the Directorate of National Cooperation and Coordination within Directorate General of Cultural Affairs in the Ministry of Culture (Lebanon) and is located in Hamra, Beirut.

The ISBN group identifier was assigned by The International ISBN Agency to Lebanon and the agency has been operating since 1999. The agreement was signed by former minister of culture, Mohamad Youssef Baydoun and has been under the directorship of Rita Ray Akl since it opened. In 2010, the ministry produced a guide to the ISBN in Arabic. The ministry usually assigns ISBNs free of charge for authors.

== Publishers ==
A publishers union was formed in Lebanon in 1947 which changed its name to the "Syndicate of Publishers Union" in 1972. Their figures indicate there are around seven hundred publishing houses in Lebanon with around 200 actively putting forward around three thousand new titles per year from a total of seven thousand five hundred published. The union helps organise the Beirut Arab International Book Fair and launched the Al-Nashiroun publishers magazine in 1998. Its aims are to protect and promote the industry and defend the interests of publishers. They suggest Lebanon has the largest number of publishers and accounts for around thirty percent of new titles published in Arabic.
