= EAN-2 =

Bar code supplement to UPC-A or EAN-13

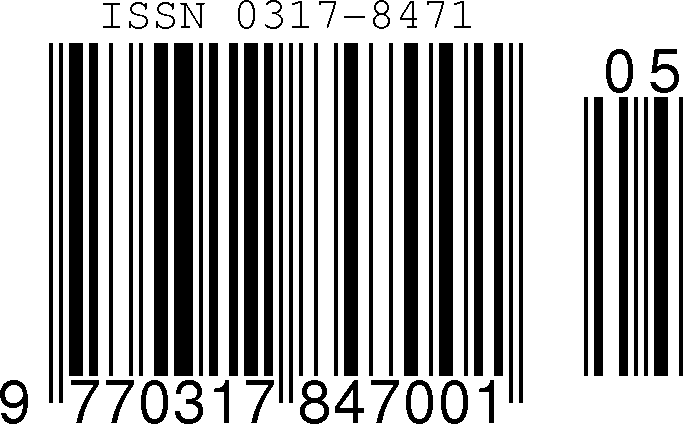
ISSN with an EAN-2 addon representing issue number 5.

The EAN-2 is a supplement to the EAN-13 and UPC-A barcodes. It is often used on magazines and periodicals to indicate an issue number.

== Encoding ==
The encoding of EAN-2 characters is very similar to that of the other European Article Numbers. The only difference is that the digits are separated by 01. The EAN-2 always begins with "01011". Also, the R-Code is not used.

Encoding of the digits
Digit	L-code	G-code
0	0001101	0100111
1	0011001	0110011
2	0010011	0011011
3	0111101	0100001
4	0100011	0011101
5	0110001	0111001
6	0101111	0000101
7	0111011	0010001
8	0110111	0001001
9	0001011	0010111

The structure of the barcode is based on the value of the two digit to be encoded. The two digits treated as a single two-digit number is reduced modulo 4 and used to find the parity pattern to be used. The parity pattern repeats every 4 values.

EAN-2 Parity
Data to encode	Parity pattern	
00	LL	Encode as 0 from L table followed by 0 from L table
01	LG	Encode as 0 from L table followed by 1 from G table
02	GL	Encode as 0 from G table followed by 2 from L table
03	GG	Encode as 0 from G table followed by 3 from G table
04	LL	Encode as 0 from L table followed by 4 from L table
05	LG	Encode as 0 from L table followed by 5 from G table
06	GL	Encode as 0 from G table followed by 6 from L table
07	GG	Encode as 0 from G table followed by 7 from G table
...	...	
98	GL	Encode as 9 from G table followed by 8 from L table
99	GG	Encode as 9 from G table followed by 9 from G table

Example - encoding 53
Start	5 (L)	Separator	3 (G)
01011	0110001	01	0100001
