= George Laurer =

American engineer and inventor (1925–2019)

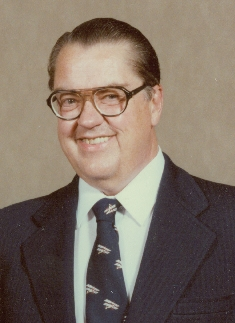
- Laurer in 1987
- Born: George Joseph Laurer III; September 23, 1925; Manhattan, New York City, U.S.
- Died: December 5, 2019 (aged 94); Wendell, North Carolina, U.S.
- Education: University of Maryland
- Occupation: Engineer
- Known for: Universal Product Code
- Spouse: Marilyn Slocum Laurer (died 2013)
- Children: 4

George Joseph Laurer III (September 23, 1925 – December 5, 2019) was an American engineer for IBM at Research Triangle Park in North Carolina. He published 20 bulletins, held 28 patents and developed the Universal Product Code (UPC) in the early 1970s. He devised the coding and pattern used for the UPC, based on Joe Woodland's more general idea for barcodes.

== Early life ==
George Joseph Laurer III was born on September 23, 1925, in New York City. His family moved to Baltimore, Maryland, so that his father, an electrical engineer, could work for the United States Navy. Laurer recovered from polio which he contracted as a teenager, nonetheless, while in 11th grade, he was drafted into the U.S. Army during World War II. After being discharged from the military, he attended technical school where he studied radio and television repair. Upon completion of his first year at the technical school, his instructor convinced him that he should not continue that course of study, but that he should go to college. Laurer graduated from the A. James Clark School of Engineering at the University of Maryland in 1951. He was still interested in radio and kept up his amateur radio licence.

== Career ==
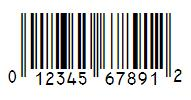
Universal Product Code was developed by Laurer while at IBM

Laurer was a 36-year employee of IBM until his retirement in June 1987. He joined IBM in 1951 as a junior engineer. By 1969, he had been promoted to senior engineer / scientist and moved to the company's offices in Research Triangle Park in North Carolina.

At IBM, Laurer was assigned the task of developing barcodes for use in grocery stores. Initially, IBM envisioned a circular bullseye pattern as proposed by Joe Woodland in 1940s. Laurer realized that the pattern was ineffective because of smearing during printing. Instead, he designed a vertical pattern of stripes which he proposed to his superior in 1971 or 1972. This change was accepted by IBM management and Laurer then worked with Woodland and mathematician David Savir to develop and refine the details. These included the addition of a check digit to provide error correction. In 1973, the IBM proposal was accepted by the Symbol Selection committee of the Uniform Grocery Product Code Council, a consortium of grocery store companies.

The Universal Product Code has bit patterns at the beginning, middle and end of the barcode called "guard bars" and these have been interpreted as the digits 666. When he first developed the code, Laurer noticed that the digit 6 appeared several times and that this might be interpreted as the number of the Beast, as his daughter was studying the Book of Revelation. When the codes started to appear in stores, there were protests and an urban legend developed. Laurer addressed this on his website:

Answer – Yes, they do RESEMBLE the code for a six. An even parity 6 is:

1 module wide black bar 1 module wide white space 1 module/ wide black bar 4 module wide white space.

There is nothing sinister about this nor does it have anything to do with the Bible's "mark of the beast" (The New Testament, The Revelation, Chapter 13, paragraph 18). It is simply a coincidence like the fact that my first, middle, and last name all have 6 letters. There is no connection with an international money code either.

== Legacy ==
Laurer was the holder of 25 patents and authored 27 published Technical Disclosure Bulletins. In 1976, he was given the Raleigh Inventor of the Year Award. In 1980, he received the Corporate Technical Achievement award from IBM.

As of 2019, UPC barcodes were being scanned more than 6 billion times each day, according to GS1.

== Personal life ==
Laurer lived in Wendell, North Carolina until his death in December 2019. His wife, Marilyn Slocum Laurer, died in 2013. They had four children.

== Published journal articles ==
- Savir, David; Laurer, George J. (1975). "The characteristics and decodability of the Universal Product Code symbol". IBM Systems Journal. 14 (1): 16–34. doi:10.1147/sj.141.0016.
