= Bookland =

1980s Unique Country Code (UCC) prefix for EAN identifiers of books

A thirteen-digit ISBN, with the 978 at the beginning representing the Unique Country Code of Bookland

"Bookland" is a fictitious country that exists solely in the European Article Number (EAN) barcode system, where it serves as the unique prefix of published books regardless of their country of origin. The codes "978" and later "979" were designated as Bookland prefixes in the 1980s to allow the EAN namespace to catalogue books by International Standard Book Numbers (ISBN) rather than requiring a separate or redundant EAN numbering system. Bookland does not represent a real geographic location.

== History ==
Until January 1, 2007, all ISBNs were allocated as 9-digit numbers followed by a modulo 11 checksum character that was either a decimal digit or the letter "X". A Bookland EAN was generated by concatenating the Bookland UCC 978, the 9 digits of the book's ISBN other than its checksum, and the EAN checksum digit.

Since parts of the 10-character ISBN space are nearly full, all books published from 2007 on have been allocated a 13-digit ISBN, which is identical to the Bookland EAN. Most of UCC 979 (formerly "Musicland") has now been assigned for the expansion of Bookland, and was first used by publishers in the French language, which can now use the additional prefix "979-10-" in addition to the nearly full "978-2-" prefix (onto which legacy 10-character ISBNs starting with "2-" have been remapped). Books numbered with prefixes other than 978 will not be mappable to 10-character ISBNs.

The GS1 is the global identification standards organization for retail. Every country has an assigned country code which precedes the company code. The "country codes" 978 and 979 are now officially registered for allocation by the International ISBN Agency, which maintains the official international registry of ISBN numbers allocated to book publishers.

== Similar mappings ==
- ISSNs (which identify periodical publications) are mapped into the UCC 977.
- ISMNs (which identify sheet music) are mapped into the UCC 979. Since the leading "M" of a legacy 10-digit ISMN number (such as M-345-24680-5) is transcoded as 0, the EAN prefix 979-0 is wholly reserved for sheet music and has been dubbed the fictitious country "Musicland". Like ISBNs, ISMNs have been officially allocated using 13 digits since mid-2008.

== See also ==
- Null Island
