= EAN-8 =

EAN/UPC symbology barcode

An example of an EAN-8 barcode

An EAN-8 is an EAN/UPC symbology barcode and is derived from the longer International Article Number (EAN-13) code. It was introduced for use on small packages where an EAN-13 barcode would be too large; for example on cigarettes, pencils, and chewing gum packets. It is encoded identically to the 12 digits of the UPC-A barcode, except that it has 4 (rather than 6) digits in each of the left and right halves.

EAN-8 barcodes may be used to encode GTIN-8 (8-digit Global Trade Identification Numbers) which are product identifiers from the GS1 System. A GTIN-8 begins with a 2- or 3-digit GS1 prefix (which is assigned to each national GS1 authority) followed by a 5- or 4-digit item reference element depending on the length of the GS1 prefix), and a checksum digit.

EAN-8 codes are common throughout the world, and companies may also use them to encode RCN-8 (8-digit Restricted Circulation Numbers), and use them to identify own-brand products sold only in their stores. RCN-8 are a subset of GTIN-8 which begin with a first digit of 0 or 2.
