= License number (East German books) =

Book identification system in East Germany

In the GDR, the license number was a book identification number. It was assigned as part of the printing approval procedure introduced in the early 1950s.

== Background ==
In the GDR – and previously in the Soviet Occupation Zone (SBZ) – publishers generally required a publishing license to operate as a publisher. This was initially issued by the Soviet Military Administration in Germany (SMAD), then from 1951 by the Office for Literature and Publishing (Main Administration for Publishers and Book Trade) and, after its integration into the Ministry of Culture, by the Ministry.

Independently of this, each edition of a book had to be individually licensed as part of the so-called printing approval process. After this process was completed, the book received a printing approval number – provided that it had been approved for printing. In those books, the specific printing approval number usually had to be stated in the imprint (see e.g. TGL 24464). The publishers usually put the number of their publishing license in front of this. Together, these formed the license number of the book.

Some publishers were able to deviate from this rule, however: for example, Dietz-Verlag and the Militärverlag der DDR only had to state their publishing license in their books, but not the printing approval number. For the Volk und Wissen publishing house, there was a regulation that all books that were confirmed as school books by the Ministry of Education could be published under a uniform printing permit.

The printing permit procedure and thus the regulations for specifying the license numbers in the books lasted until December 1, 1989. After that, during a short transitional period, the publishers only printed the number of their publishing license as the license number in the imprint, before this too became unnecessary in the course of reunification.

== Creation of the license number ==
The license number consisted of several parts: As a rule, the publisher's license number was given first (often together with the abbreviation VLN). This was usually separated from the printing authorization number by a period and a space ("."). However, some publishers also used other characters ("/", "-" or "·") or spaces instead. This was usually handled uniformly within a publisher.

The printing approval number consisted of three parts separated by a slash (“/”): the publisher number, a number running within a year and the year of publication. The publisher number and the publisher's license number were not identical and could not be derived from one another. The publisher number was permanently assigned to a publisher as part of the printing approval process and makes it possible to determine the publisher from the printing approval number alone.

In this way, books could be uniquely identified using the printing permit number. Since each new edition of a book had to be licensed again, each edition of a book was also assigned a new license number.

As a rule, the number of the publishing license and the publishing number within the printing permit number remained unchanged over the years. However, they could sometimes change over time - e.g. in connection with restructuring, mergers and spin-offs of publishing houses.
