= Book Item and Component Identifier =

The Book Item and Component Identifier, or BICI, is a draft standard of the United States National Information Standards Organization (NISO) that would provide a unique identifier for items or components within a book or publication to which an International Standard Book Number (ISBN) has been assigned. It is related to the Serial Item and Contribution Identifier (SICI).
