= EAN-5 =

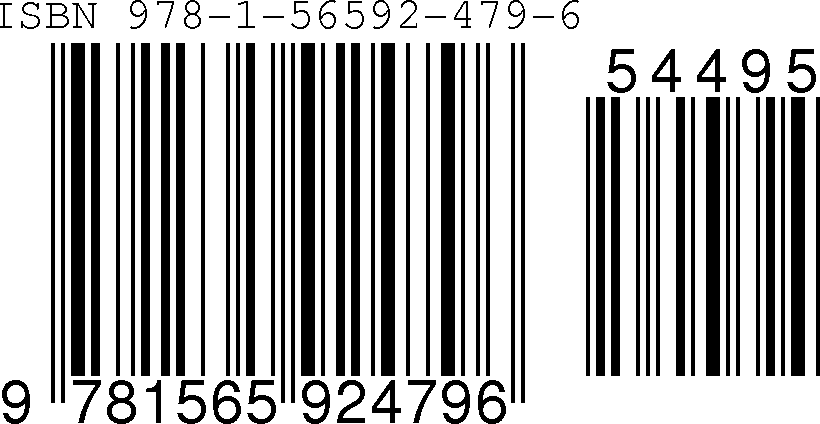
An ISBN with an EAN-5 addon (rightmost bars) representing US$44.95.

The EAN-5 is a 5-digit European Article Number code, and is a supplement to the EAN-13 barcode used on books. It is used to give a suggestion for the price of the book.

First Digit	Description
5	$ US
6	$ Canada
4	$ New Zealand
3	$ Australia
0 & 1	British pounds

ISBN Encoding – Country and Currency Values Description

Value	Definition
50000	NACS Trade
59999	Price for $100 and more
90000	NACS New
90000-98999	For internal purposes (BISG recommend 90000 if no price is given)
99000-99989	Reserved for the industry market
99990-99999	Reserved for National Association of College Stores (NACS)
99990	NACS used
99991	NACS copies

== Encoding ==
The Encoding of EAN-5 characters is very similar to that of the other European Article Numbers. The only difference is that the digits are separated by 01. The EAN-5 always begins with '01011.' Also, the R-Code is not used.

Encoding of the digits
Digit	L-code	G-code
0	0001101	0100111
1	0011001	0110011
2	0010011	0011011
3	0111101	0100001
4	0100011	0011101
5	0110001	0111001
6	0101111	0000101
7	0111011	0010001
8	0110111	0001001
9	0001011	0010111

The structure of the barcode is based on the checksum. In order to compute the checksum, multiply each of the digits by either 3 or 9, alternating each time. Then add them and then do a mod 10. So the checksum for 05415 is 1 based on the following calculations:

    0*3=0
    5*9=45
    4*3=12
    1*9=9
    5*3=15
  ----------
     81     %    10  = 1

Once you have the checksum digit, you can look up the structure in the following table. Note that the checksum digit is not in the final 5 digits, and is not intended to validate the 5 digit data, but rather to validate the reading of the EAN-5 overall.

Structure of EAN-5
Checksum	Structure
0	GGLLL
1	GLGLL
2	GLLGL
3	GLLLG
4	LGGLL
5	LLGGL
6	LLLGG
7	LGLGL
8	LGLLG
9	LLGLG

Example - encoding 52495
Start	5 (G)	Separator	2 (L)	Separator	4 (G)	Separator	9 (L)	Separator	5 (L)
01011	0111001	01	0010011	01	0011101	01	0001011	01	0110001
