= Universal Product Code =

Barcode system for tracking trade items

A UPC barcode

The Universal Product Code (UPC or UPC code) is a barcode symbology that is used worldwide for tracking trade items in stores.

The chosen symbology has bars (or spaces) of exactly 1, 2, 3, or 4 units wide each; each decimal digit to be encoded consists of two bars and two spaces chosen to have a total width of 7 units, in both an "even" and an "odd" parity form, which enables being scanned in either direction. Special "guard patterns" (3 or 5 units wide, not encoding a digit) are intermixed to help decoding.

A UPC (technically, a UPC-A) consists of 12 digits that are uniquely assigned to each trade item. The international GS1 organisation assigns the digits used for both the UPC and the related International Article Number (EAN) barcode. UPC data structures are a component of Global Trade Item Numbers (GTINs) and follow the global GS1 specification, which is based on international standards. Some retailers, such as clothing and furniture, do not use the GS1 system, instead using other barcode symbologies or article number systems. Some retailers use the EAN/UPC barcode symbology, but do not use a GTIN for products sold only in their own stores.

Research indicates that the adoption and diffusion of the UPC stimulated innovation and contributed to the growth of international retail supply chains.

== History ==
In 1973, a group of trade associations from the grocery industry formed the Uniform Product Code Council (UPCC) which, with the help of consultants Larry Russell and Tom Wilson of McKinsey & Company, defined the numerical format that formed the basis of the Uniform Product Code. Technology firms including Charegon, IBM, Litton-Zellweger, Pitney Bowes-Alpex, Plessey-Anker, RCA, Scanner Inc., Singer, and Dymo Industries/Data General, put forward alternative proposals for symbol representations to the council. The Symbol Selection Committee finally chose to implement the IBM proposal designed by George J. Laurer in the North Carolina Research Triangle Park but with a slight modification to the font in the human readable area.

The first UPC-marked item ever to be scanned at a retail checkout was a 10-pack (50 sticks) of Wrigley's Juicy Fruit chewing gum, purchased at the Marsh supermarket in Troy, Ohio, at 8:01 a.m. on 26 June 1974. The NCR cash register rang up 67 cents. The shopping cart also contained other barcoded items but the gum was the first one picked up at the checkout. A facsimile of the gum packet went on display at the Smithsonian Institution's American history museum in Washington, D.C.

Murray Eden was a consultant on the team that created the Universal Product Code barcode. As chairman of a committee of scientists at the Massachusetts Institute of Technology, he helped "select a symbol that would endure the inevitable rush of technology that lay ahead." He chose the font, and he came up with the idea to add numbers to the bottom, which is a fail-safe system, in case the barcode reader is not working correctly.

== IBM proposal ==
Around late 1969, IBM at Research Triangle Park (RTP) in North Carolina assigned George Laurer to determine how to make a supermarket scanner and label. In late 1970, Heard Baumeister provided equations to calculate characters-per-inch achievable by two IBM bar codes, Delta A and Delta B. In February 1971, Baumeister joined Laurer.

Delta B compared bar widths to space width to code bits. This was extremely sensitive to ink spread, where improper levels of ink or pressure would cause both edges of a bar to spread outward or shrink in.

In mid 1971, William "Bill" Crouse invented a new bar code called Delta C. It achieved four times the characters per inch as Delta B.

Delta C achieved its higher performance by only using leading to leading or trailing to trailing edges which was unaffected by uniform ink spread. The code provided best performance when it had a defined character set with a fixed reference distance that spanned most or preferably all the character.

In August 1971, Crouse joined the scanner effort. After several months they had made no progress. They were aware of the RCA bull's eye label that could be scanned with a simple straight line laser scanner, but a readable label was far too large.

Although Litton Industries proposed a bull's eye symbol cut in half to reduce the area, it was still too large and presented the same ink smear printing problems as the RCA symbol. The redundancy and checking ability were removed completely. They were also aware of the many proposals from around the world, none of which were feasible.

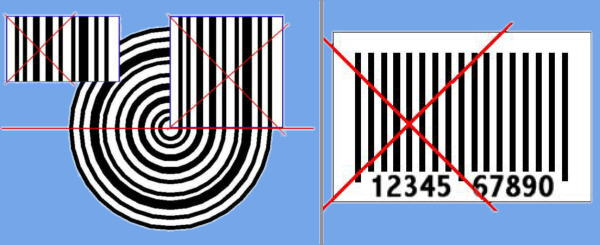
The UPC Label showing the general characteristics of Baumeister's proposals

In the spring of 1972, Baumeister announced a breakthrough. He proposed a label with bars that were slightly longer than the distance across all bars that needed to be read in a single pass. This label could be scanned with a simple "X" scanner only slightly more complex than the straight line laser scanner. The next day Baumeister suggested if the label were split into two halves the bar lengths could be cut nearly in half.

These two proposals reduced the area from the bull's eye by one third and then one sixth. The image to the right shows the label proposed by Baumeister. He did not specify any specific bar code as that was well understood. Except for the bar coding and ten digits the UPC label today is his proposal. Shortly after that Baumeister transferred to another area of RTP.

Laurer proceeded to define the details of the label and write a proposal. N.J. Woodland was assigned as planner for the project and aided Laurer with writing his proposal.

Laurer's first attempt with a bar code used Delta B. The resulting label size was about six inches by three inches which was too large. Crouse suggested that Laurer use his Delta C bar code and provided a copy of his patent that had a sample alphanumeric character set and rules to generate other size alphabets. This reduced the label size to about 1.5 in × 0.9 in (38 mm × 23 mm).

Later Laurer asked Crouse for assistance in how the scanner could detect a label. Together they defined guard bars and a definition of how to detect the label. The guard bars also provided identification for half label discrimination and training bars for the scanner threshold circuits. Laurer had a complete label definition and proceeded to write his proposal.

Previously Crouse had an idea for a simple wand worn like a ring and bracelet. He decided to develop that wand to provide a demonstration of the label.

On 1 December 1972, IBM presented Laurer's proposal to the Super Market Committee in Rochester, Minnesota, the location where IBM would develop the scanner. During the presentation, Crouse gave a lab demonstration where he read UPC-like labels with his ring wand. In addition to reading regular labels, he read the large two-page centerfold label in the proposal booklet. He then turned to a page showing a photo of labeled items sitting on a table. The labels were small and flawed due to the resolution of the printed photo but the wand read many of them. This demonstration showed the robustness of the pure Delta C code. The proposal was accepted.

One month later, 1 January 1973 Crouse transferred back to IBM's Advanced Technology group, and Laurer remained with the full responsibility for the label.

Dymo Industries, makers of handheld printing devices insisted that the code be character independent, so that handheld printing devices could produce the bar code in store if the items were not bar-coded by the manufacturers. Dymo's proposal was accepted by IBM and incorporated in IBM's latest proposal.

It was decided that the two halves of the label should have a different set of numeric characters. The character set Laurer derived from the Delta C patent used seven printable increments or units where two bars and two spaces would be printed. This yielded twenty combinations of characters, but there were two pairs that when read by Delta C rules yielded the same code for the pair.

Since eighteen characters were not enough Laurer tried adding one unit to the character set. This yielded twenty-six Delta C characters which could provide the two sets of decimal characters but it also added fourteen percent to the width of the label and thereby the height. This would be a thirty percent increase in area or a label of 1.7 in × 1.03 in (43 mm × 26 mm). Laurer felt this was not acceptable.

Laurer returned to the original character set with twenty characters but four of those were two pairs with the same Delta C reading. He decided to use them all. To distinguish between the pairs he would measure one bar width in each of the pairs to distinguish them from each other. For each pair those bars would be one or two units wide.

Laurer did not apply Baumeister's equations to this set. He felt just one bar width measurement would not be too serious. As it turned out it would have required over fifty percent increase in width and height for an area increase of more than double. Laurer later admitted these four characters in each set were responsible for most of the scanner read errors.

David Savir, a mathematician, was given the task of proving the symbol could be printed and would meet the reliability requirements, and was most likely unaware of Baumeister's equations. He and Laurer added two more digits to the ten for error detection and correction.

Then they decided to add odd/even parity to the number of units filled with bars in each side. Odd/even parity is a technique used to detect any odd number of bit errors in a bit stream. They decided to use odd on one half and even on the other. This would provide additional indication of which half ticket was being read. This meant that every bar width had to be read accurately to provide a good reading. It also meant every space would also be known.

Requiring every bit width to be read precisely basically nullified the Delta C advantage except for the Delta C reference measurement. Only the strange character set and the size of the label remains as a shadow of the Delta C code. The size was still that calculated for pure Delta C. If the label size had been properly recalculated, taking into account the required bar width measurements the label would have been far too large to be acceptable.

Mechanical engineering and electronic circuit design commonly require worst case designs using known tolerances. Many engineers working with bar codes had little experience with such things and used somewhat intuitive methods. This was the cause of the poor performance of the Delta B code and quite likely the failure of RCA's bull's eye scanner.

The following table shows the workable labels, available in the early 1970s, with their sizes.

Label type	Label dimensions	Area
Bull's eye with Morse Code	Large	Large
Bull's eye with Delta B	12.0 in (300 mm) diameter	113.10 in^{2} (729.7 cm^{2})
Bull's eye with Delta A	9.0 in (230 mm) diameter	63.62 in^{2} (410.5 cm^{2})
Baumeister 1st w/ Delta B	6.0 in × 5.8 in (150 mm × 150 mm)	34.80 in^{2} (224.5 cm^{2})
Baumeister 2 halves w/ Delta B	6.0 in × 3.0 in (152 mm × 76 mm)	18.00 in^{2} (116.1 cm^{2})
Baumeister 2 halves w/ Delta A	4.5 in × 2.3 in (114 mm × 58 mm)	10.35 in^{2} (66.8 cm^{2})
Baumeister with Delta C	1.5 in × 0.9 in (38 mm × 23 mm)	1.35 in^{2} (8.7 cm^{2})

This is assuming a bull's eye with the same information and reliable readability.

== Composition ==
Each UPC-A barcode consists of a scannable strip of black bars and white spaces above a sequence of 12 numerical digits. No alphabetic characters, symbols, or other characters of any kind can appear on a UPC-A barcode. There is a one-to-one correspondence between 12-digit number and strip of black bars and white spaces, i.e. there is only one way to represent each 12-digit number visually and there is only one way to represent each strip of black bars and white spaces numerically.

The scannable area of every UPC-A barcode follows the pattern SLLLLLLMRRRRRRE, where S (start), M (middle), and E (end) guard patterns are represented the same way on every UPC-A barcode and the L (left) and R (right) sections collectively represent the 12 numerical digits that make each UPC-A unique. The first digit L indicates a particular number system to be used by the following digits. The last digit R is an error detecting check digit, that allows some errors to be detected in scanning or manual entry. The guard patterns separate the two groups of six numerical digits and establish the timing.

UPC-A

UPC-E

UPC-A 042100005264 is equivalent to UPC-E 425261 with the "EOEEOO" parity pattern, which is defined by UPC-A number system 0 and UPC-A check digit 4.

=== Formatting ===
UPC-A barcodes can be printed at various densities to accommodate a variety of printing and scanning processes. The significant dimensional parameter is called x-dimension (width of single module element). The width of each bar (space) is determined by multiplying the x-dimension and the module width (1, 2, 3, or 4 units) of each bar (space). Since the guard patterns each include two bars, and each of the 12 digits of the UPC-A barcode consists of two bars and two spaces, all UPC-A barcodes consist of exactly (3 × 2) + (12 × 2) = 30 bars, of which 6 represent guard patterns and 24 represent numerical digits.

The x-dimension for the UPC-A at the nominal size is 0.33 mm (0.013"). Nominal symbol height for UPC-A is 25.9 mm (1.02"). The bars forming the S (start), M (middle), and E (end) guard patterns, are extended downwards by 5 times x-dimension, with a resulting nominal symbol height of 27.55 mm (1.08"). This also applies to the bars of the first and last numerical digit of UPC-A barcode. UPC-A can be reduced or magnified anywhere from 80% to 200%.

A quiet zone, with a width of at least 9 times the x-dimension, must be present on each side of the scannable area of the UPC-A barcode. For a GTIN-12 number encoded in a UPC-A barcode, the first and last digits of the human-readable interpretation are always placed outside the symbol in order to indicate the quiet zones that are necessary for UPC barcode scanners to work properly.

== Encoding ==
UPC number encoding
Value	L encoding							R encoding						
0	3			2		1	1	3			2		1	1
1	2		2		2		1	2		2		2		1
2	2		1	2		2		2		1	2		2	
3	1	4				1	1	1	4				1	1
4	1	1	3			2		1	1	3			2	
5	1	2		3			1	1	2		3			1
6	1	1	1	4				1	1	1	4			
7	1	3			1	2		1	3			1	2	
8	1	2		1	3			1	2		1	3		
9	3			1	1	2		3			1	1	2	

The UPC-A barcode is visually represented by strips of bars and spaces that encode the UPC-A 12-digit number. Each digit is represented by a unique pattern of 2 bars and 2 spaces. The bars and spaces are variable width, i.e. 1, 2, 3, or 4 modules wide. The total width for a digit is always 7 modules; consequently, UPC-A 12-digit number requires a total of 7×12 = 84 modules.

A complete UPC-A is 95 modules wide: 84 modules for the digits (L and R sections) combined with 11 modules for the S (start), M (middle), and E (end) guard patterns. The S (start) and E (end) guard patterns are 3 modules wide and use the pattern bar-space-bar, where each bar and space is one module wide. The M (middle) guard pattern is 5 modules wide and uses the pattern space-bar-space-bar-space, where each bar and space is also one module wide. In addition, a UPC-A symbol requires a quiet zone (extra space of 9 modules wide) before the S (start) and after the E (end) guard patterns.

Encoding table for UPC-A barcode pattern SLLLLLLMRRRRRRE
Quiet zone	S (start)	L (left numerical digit)										M (middle)	R (right numerical digit)										E (end)	Quiet zone
Quiet zone	S (start)	0	1	2	3	4	5	6	7	8	9	M (middle)	0	1	2	3	4	5	6	7	8	9	E (end)	Quiet zone

The UPC-A's left-hand side digits (the digits to the left of the M (middle) guard pattern) have odd parity, which means the total width of the black bars is an odd number of modules. On the contrary, the right-hand side digits have even parity. Consequently, a UPC scanner can determine whether it is scanning a symbol from left-to-right or from right-to-left (the symbol is upside-down). After seeing a S (start) or E (end) guard pattern (they are the same, bar-space-bar, whichever direction they are read), the scanner will first see odd parity digits, if scanning left-to-right, or even parity digits, if scanning right-to-left. With the parity/direction information, an upside-down symbol will not confuse the scanner. When confronted with an upside-down symbol, the scanner may simply ignore it (many scanners alternate left-to-right and right-to-left scans, so they will read the symbol on a subsequent pass) or recognize the digits and put them in the right order. There is another property in the digit encoding. The right-hand side digits are the optical inverse of the left-hand side digits, i.e. black bars are turned into white spaces and vice versa. For example, the left-hand side "4" is space×1 - bar×1 - space×3 - bar×2, meanwhile the right-hand side "4" is bar×1 - space×1 - bar×3 - space×2.

== Numbering ==
The number of UPC-A and UPC-E barcodes are limited by the standards used to create them.

UPC-A
$$\begin{align}
\text{(possible values per left digit)} ^ \text{(left digits)} &\times \text{(possible values per right digit)} ^ \text{(5 right digits)}\\
= 10^6 &\times 10^5 = 100,000,000,000.
\end{align}$$
UPC-E
$$\begin{align}
\text{(possible values per digit)} ^ \text{(digits)} &\times \text{(possible parity patterns per UPC-E number)}\\
= 10^6 &\times 2 = 2,000,000.\end{align}$$

=== Number system digit ===
Below is a description of all possible number systems with the corresponding 12-digit UPC-A numbering scheme LLLLLLRRRRRR, where L denotes the number system digit and R the check digit.

0–1, 6–9
For most products. The LLLLL digits are the manufacturer code (assigned by local GS1 organization), and the RRRRR digits are the product code.
2
Reserved for local use (store/warehouse), for items sold by variable weight. Variable-weight items, such as meats, fresh fruits, or vegetables, are assigned an item number by the store, if they are packaged there. In this case, the LLLLL is the item number, and the RRRRR is either the weight or the price, with the first R determining which (0 for weight).
3
Drugs by National Drug Code (NDC) number. Pharmaceuticals in the U.S. use the middle 10 digits of the UPC as their NDC number. Though usually only over-the-counter drugs are scanned at point of sale, NDC-based UPCs are used on prescription drug packages and surgical products and, in this case, are commonly called UPN Codes.
4
Reserved for local use (store/warehouse), often for loyalty cards or store coupons.
5
Coupons. The LLLLL digits are digits 2-6 of the product's UPC prefix, the next three RRR are a family code (set by manufacturer or supplied by the coupon clearing house), and the next two RR are a value code (according to the GS1 value code table), which determines the amount of the discount. These coupons can be doubled or tripled.

=== Check digit calculation ===
The UPC includes a check digit to detect common data entry errors. For example, UPC-A codes choose the check digit $x_{12}$ to satisfy the check digit equation:

$$(3x_1 + x_2 + 3x_3 + x_4 + 3x_5 + x_6 + 3x_7 + x_8 + 3x_9 + x_{10} + 3x_{11} + x_{12}) \equiv 0 \pmod{10}.$$

If an entered code does not satisfy the equation, then it is not a valid UPC-A.

The UPC-A check digit may be calculated as follows:

1. Sum the digits at odd-numbered positions (first, third, fifth,..., eleventh).
2. Multiply the result by 3.
3. Add the digit sum at even-numbered positions (second, fourth, sixth,..., tenth) to the result.
4. Find the result modulo 10 (i.e. the remainder, when divided by 10) and call it M.
5. If M is zero, then the check digit is 0; otherwise the check digit is 10 − M.

For example, in a UPC-A barcode "03600029145x_{12}", where x_{12} is the unknown check digit, x_{12} may be calculated by:

1. Sum the odd-numbered digits (0 + 6 + 0 + 2 + 1 + 5 = 14).
2. Multiply the result by 3 (14 × 3 = 42).
3. Add the even-numbered digits (42 + (3 + 0 + 0 + 9 + 4) = 58).
4. Find the result modulo 10 (58 mod 10 = 8 = M).
5. If M is not 0, subtract M from 10 (10 − M = 10 − 8 = 2).

Thus, the check digit x_{12} is 2.

The check digit equation is selected to have reasonable error detection properties (see Luhn algorithm).

- UPC-A can detect 100% of single digit errors.
  A single digit error means exactly one digit is wrong. Let the difference modulo 10 of the erroneous digit and the correct digit be d. The value of d cannot be zero because that means the digits are the same, but d can be any other value in {1, 2, 3, 4, 5, 6, 7, 8, 9}. If the error digit is in an odd position (weight 1), the left hand side of check digit equation changes by d and the equivalence is no longer zero. If the error digit is in an even position (weight 3), then the left hand side changes by 3d, but that change is also nonzero modulo 10, so the check digit equation is not satisfied.
- UPC-A can detect about 89% of transposition errors. Specifically, if and only if the difference between two adjacent digits is 5, the UPC-A can't detect their transposition.
  1. If 2 neighboring digits are transposed, then one of the digits a will be weighted by 1, and the other digit b = a + d will be weighted by 3, where d is the difference between the two digits. If the digits were in their correct order, they would contribute
    $$1a + 3b = 1a + 3(a+d) = 4a + 3d$$
    to the left hand side of the check digit equation. In the transposed order, they contribute
    $$1b + 3a = 3a + 1(a+d) = 4a + d$$.
    to the LHS. Subtracting the two contributions gives how much they change the LHS:
    $$(4a + 3d) - (4a + d) = 2d$$
    An error will be detected as long as the modular change is nonzero; if 2d ≡ 0 modulo 10, then the change will not be detected. Consequently, only when the character difference d ≡ 5 will an error be undetected (when d ≡ 0 the degenerate "transposition" is not an error).
  2. Next consider how often a transposition has a distance d of 5.

Here is the Table of d-transpositions for UPC-A barcodes, where $d \in \{0, 1, 2, \ldots, 9\}:$

Table of d-transpositions for UPC-A barcodes
d N°	0	1	2	3	4	5	6	7	8	9
1	0 0	0 1	0 2	0 3	0 4	0 5	0 6	0 7	0 8	0 9
2	1 1	1 2	1 3	1 4	1 5	1 6	1 7	1 8	1 9	
3	2 2	2 3	2 4	2 5	2 6	2 7	2 8	2 9		
4	3 3	3 4	3 5	3 6	3 7	3 8	3 9			
5	4 4	4 5	4 6	4 7	4 8	4 9				
6	5 5	5 6	5 7	5 8	5 9					
7	6 6	6 7	6 8	6 9						
8	7 7	7 8	7 9							
9	8 8	8 9								
10	9 9									
Sum	10	18	16	14	12	10	8	6	4	2

Row Sum contains the number of d-transpositions, therefore the proportion of non-detectable transposition errors is (ignoring the transpositions where d = 0):

$\frac{10}{18 + 16 + 14 + 12 + 10 + 8 + 6 + 4 + 2}=\frac{10}{90}=11.111\ldots\%.$

▯

== Variations ==
UPC in its most common usage technically refers to UPC-A.

Other variants of the UPC exist:

- UPC-B is a 12-digit version of UPC with no check digit, developed for the National Drug Code (NDC) and National Health Related Items Code. It has 11 digits plus a number system digit, and is not in common use.
- UPC-C is a 12-digit code with a number system digit and a check digit; not in common use.
- UPC-D is a variable length code (12 digits or more) with the 12th digit being the check digit. These versions are not in common use.
- UPC-E is a 6-digit code, that has its equivalent in UPC-A 12-digit code with number system 0 or 1.
- UPC-2 is a 2-digit supplement to the UPC used to indicate the edition of a magazine or periodical.
- UPC-5 is a 5-digit supplement to the UPC used to indicate suggested retail price for books.

=== UPC-E ===
To allow the use of UPC barcodes on smaller packages, where a full 12-digit barcode may not fit, a version of UPC called UPC-E was developed, in which the number system digit, all trailing zeros in the manufacturer code, and all leading zeros in the product code are omitted. This symbology differs from UPC-A in that it only uses a 6-digit code, does not use M (middle) guard pattern, and the E (end) guard pattern is formed as space-bar-space-bar-space-bar, i.e., UPC-E barcode follows the pattern SDDDDDDE. The way in which a 6-digit UPC-E relates to a 12-digit UPC-A is determined by the UPC-E numerical pattern and UPC-E parity pattern. It can only correspond to UPC-A number system 0 or 1, the value of which, along with the UPC-A check digit, determines the UPC-E parity pattern of the encoding. With the manufacturer code digits represented by M's, and product code digits by P's, then:

Last UPC-E digit	UPC-E numerical pattern	UPC-A equivalent	Available product numbers
0	MMPPP0	0 or 1 + MM000-00PPP + check digit	PPP = 000–999
1	MMPPP1	0 or 1 + MM100-00PPP + check digit	PPP = 000–999
2	MMPPP2	0 or 1 + MM200-00PPP + check digit	PPP = 000–999
3	MMMPP3	0 or 1 + MMM00-000PP + check digit	PP = 00–99
4	MMMMP4	0 or 1 + MMMM0-0000P + check digit	P = 0–9
5	MMMMM5	0 or 1 + MMMMM-00005 + check digit	5 = P
6	MMMMM6	0 or 1 + MMMMM-00006 + check digit	6 = P
7	MMMMM7	0 or 1 + MMMMM-00007 + check digit	7 = P
8	MMMMM8	0 or 1 + MMMMM-00008 + check digit	8 = P
9	MMMMM9	0 or 1 + MMMMM-00009 + check digit	9 = P

For example, a UPC-E 654321 may correspond to the UPC-A 065100004327 or 165100004324, depending on the UPC-E parity pattern of the encoded digits, as described next:

UPC-A check digit	UPC-E parity pattern for UPC-A number system 0	UPC-E parity pattern for UPC-A number system 1
0	EEEOOO	OOOEEE
1	EEOEOO	OOEOEE
2	EEOOEO	OOEEOE
3	EEOOOE	OOEEEO
4	EOEEOO	OEOOEE
5	EOOEEO	OEEOOE
6	EOOOEE	OEEEOO
7	EOEOEO	OEOEOE
8	EOEOOE	OEOEEO
9	EOOEOE	OEEOEO

Encoding table for UPC-E barcode pattern SDDDDDDE
S (start)	O (odd parity digit)										E (even parity digit)										E (end)
S (start)	0	1	2	3	4	5	6	7	8	9	0	1	2	3	4	5	6	7	8	9	E (end)
	3-2-1-1	2-2-2-1	2-1-2-2	1-4-1-1	1-1-3-2	1-2-3-1	1-1-1-4	1-3-1-2	1-2-1-3	3-1-1-2	1-1-2-3	1-2-2-2	2-2-1-2	1-1-4-1	2-3-1-1	1-3-2-1	4-1-1-1	2-1-3-1	3-1-2-1	2-1-1-3	

UPC-E 654321 with "EOEOEO" parity pattern (UPC-A 065100004327) would be encoded as

1-1-1 4-1-1-1 1-2-3-1 2-3-1-1 1-4-1-1 2-2-1-2 2-2-2-1 1-1-1-1-1-1.

The barcode would look like this:

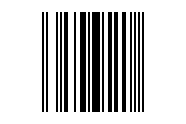

=== EAN-13 ===
The EAN-13 was developed as a superset of UPC-A, adding an extra digit to the beginning of every UPC-A number. This expanded the number of unique values theoretically possible by ten times to 1 trillion. EAN-13 barcodes also indicate the country in which the company that sells the product is based (which may or may not be the same as the country in which the good is manufactured). The three leading digits of the code determine this, according to the GS1 country codes. Every UPC-A code can be easily converted to the equivalent EAN-13 code by prepending 0 digit to the UPC-A code. This does not change the check digit. All point-of-sale systems can now understand both equally.

EAN-8 is an 8-digit variation of the EAN barcode.

== See also ==
- GS1 – International supply-chain standards organization
- Proof of purchase
