= International Article Number =

Standard barcode system used in global trade

A GTIN-13 number encoded in an EAN-13 barcode. The first digit is always placed outside the symbol, and a right ">" indicator is used to indicate a "Quiet Zone" that is necessary for barcode scanners to work properly. The GS1 code in this example, 590, is assigned to Poland.

International Article Number, also known as the European Article Number (EAN), is a global standard that defines a barcode format and a unique numbering system used in retail and trade. It helps identify specific types of retail products according to their packaging and manufacturer, making it easier to track and manage products in international trade.

Originally developed to simplify product identification in stores, the EAN system has been integrated into the broader Global Trade Item Number (GTIN) standard. While GTIN can be expressed with any barcode format, the EAN barcode format remains the most widely recognized one used in inventory control, wholesale transactions, and accounting processes.

The most widely used version is EAN-13, an extension of the earlier 12-digit Universal Product Code (UPC-A) with an optional numeric prefix indicating the country of registration. Where space is limited, the shorter EAN-8 format can be used. EAN-2 and EAN-5 can be used to append supplemental information, such as periodical issue numbers and prices.

== Composition ==
A 13-digit EAN-13 number consists of four components:

- GS1 prefix – 3 digits
- Manufacturer code – variable length
- Product code – variable length
- Check digit

=== GS1 prefix ===
The first three digits of the EAN-13 (GS1 Prefix) usually identify the GS1 Member Organization which the manufacturer has joined, but do not necessarily declare where the product is made. Note that EAN-13 codes beginning with 0 are actually 12-digit UPC codes with a prepended 0 digit. In recent years, more products sold by retailers outside the United States and Canada have been using EAN-13 codes beginning with 0, since they were generated by GS1-US.

GS1 defines the prefixes 020-029 as being available for retailer internal use (or internal use by other types of business). Some retailers use this for proprietary (own brand or unbranded) products, although many retailers obtain their own manufacturer's code for their own brands. Other retailers use at least part of this prefix for products which are packaged in store, for example, items weighed and served over a counter for a customer. In these cases, the barcode may encode a price, quantity or weight along with a product identifier – in a retailer defined way. The product identifier may be one assigned by the Produce Electronic Identification Board (PEIB) or may be retailer assigned. Retailers who have historically used UPC barcodes tend to use GS1 prefixes starting with "02" for store-packaged products.

The EAN "country code" 978 (and later 979) has been allocated since the 1980s to reserve a Unique Country Code (UCC) prefix for EAN identifiers of published books, regardless of country of origin, so that the EAN space can catalog books by ISBNs rather than maintaining a redundant parallel numbering system. This is informally known as "Bookland". The prefix 979 with first digit 0 is used for International Standard Music Number (ISMN) and the prefix 977 indicates International Standard Serial Number (ISSN).

=== Manufacturer code ===
The manufacturer code is a unique value assigned to each manufacturer by the numbering authority indicated by the GS1 Prefix. All products produced by a given company will use the same manufacturer code. EAN-13 uses what are called "variable-length manufacturer codes". Assigning fixed-length 5-digit manufacturer codes means that each manufacturer can have up to 99,999 product codes, or 9,999 for 3 digit GS1 prefixes. Many manufacturers do not have that many products, which means hundreds or even thousands of potential product codes are being wasted on manufacturers that only have a few products. Thus if a potential manufacturer knows that it is only going to produce a few products, EAN-13 may issue it a longer manufacturer code, leaving less space for the product code. This results in more efficient use of the available manufacturer and product codes.

In ISBN and ISSN, this component is used to identify the language in which the publication was issued and managed by a transnational agency covering several countries, or to identify the country where the legal deposits are made by a publisher registered with a national agency, and it is further subdivided any allocating subblocks for publishers; many countries have several prefixes allocated in the ISSN and ISBN registries.

=== Product code ===
The product code is assigned by the manufacturer. The product code immediately follows the manufacturer code. The total length of the manufacturer code plus the product code should be 9 or 10 digits depending on the length of the country code (2–3 digits).

In ISBN, ISMN and ISSN, it uniquely identifies the publication from the same publisher; it should be used and allocated by the registered publisher in order to avoid creating gaps.

=== Check digit ===
The check digit is an additional digit used to verify that a barcode has been scanned correctly. It is computed modulo 10, where the weights in the checksum calculation alternate between 3 and 1. In particular, since the weights are relatively prime to 10, the EAN-13 system will detect all single digit errors. It also recognizes 90% of transposition errors (all cases, where the difference between adjacent digits is not 5).

== Calculation of checksum digit ==
The checksum is calculated as sum of products – taking an alternating weight value (3 or 1) times the value of each data digit. The checksum digit is the digit which must be added to this checksum to get a number divisible by 10 (i.e. the additive inverse of the checksum, modulo 10). See ISBN-13 check digit calculation for a more extensive description and algorithm. The Global Location Number (GLN) also uses the same method.

=== Position – weight ===
The weight at a specific position in the EAN code is alternating (3 or 1) in a way, that the final data digit has a weight of 3 (and thus the check digit has a weight of 1).

All Global Trade Item Number (GTIN) and Serial Shipping Container Code (SSCC) codes meet the next rule:

Numbering the positions from the right (code aligned to the right), the odd data digits are always weight of 3 and the even data digits are always weight of 1, regardless of the length of the code.

Weights for 18-digit SSCC code and GTINs (GTIN-8, GTIN-12, GTIN-13, GTIN-14):

position	17	16	15	14	13	12	11	10	9	8	7	6	5	4	3	2	1
weight	3	1	3	1	3	1	3	1	3	1	3	1	3	1	3	1	3

Weights for EAN-13 code:

position	12	11	10	9	8	7	6	5	4	3	2	1
weight	1	3	1	3	1	3	1	3	1	3	1	3

Weights for EAN-8 code:

position	7	6	5	4	3	2	1
weight	3	1	3	1	3	1	3

=== Calculation examples ===
- For EAN-13 barcode 400638133393x, where x is the unknown check digit, (Stabilo Point 88 Art. No. 88/57), the check digit calculation is:

position	12	11	10	9	8	7	6	5	4	3	2	1
first 12 digits of barcode	4	0	0	6	3	8	1	3	3	3	9	3
weight	1	3	1	3	1	3	1	3	1	3	1	3
partial sum	4	0	0	18	3	24	1	9	3	9	9	9
checksum												89

The nearest multiple of 10 that is equal to or higher than the checksum, is 90. Subtract them: 90 - 89 = 1, which is the check digit x of the barcode.

- For EAN-8 barcode 7351353x, where x is the unknown check digit, the check digit calculation is:

position	7	6	5	4	3	2	1
first 7 digits of barcode	7	3	5	1	3	5	3
weight	3	1	3	1	3	1	3
partial sum	21	3	15	1	9	5	9
checksum							63

The nearest multiple of 10 that is equal to or higher than the checksum, is 70. Subtract them: 70 - 63 = 7, which is the check digit x of the barcode.

== Binary encoding of data digits into EAN-13 barcode ==
The GTIN numbers, encoded to UPC-A, EAN-8 and EAN-13, all use similar encoding. The encoded data is usually repeated in plain text below the barcode.

=== Barcode structure ===
Encoding EAN-13

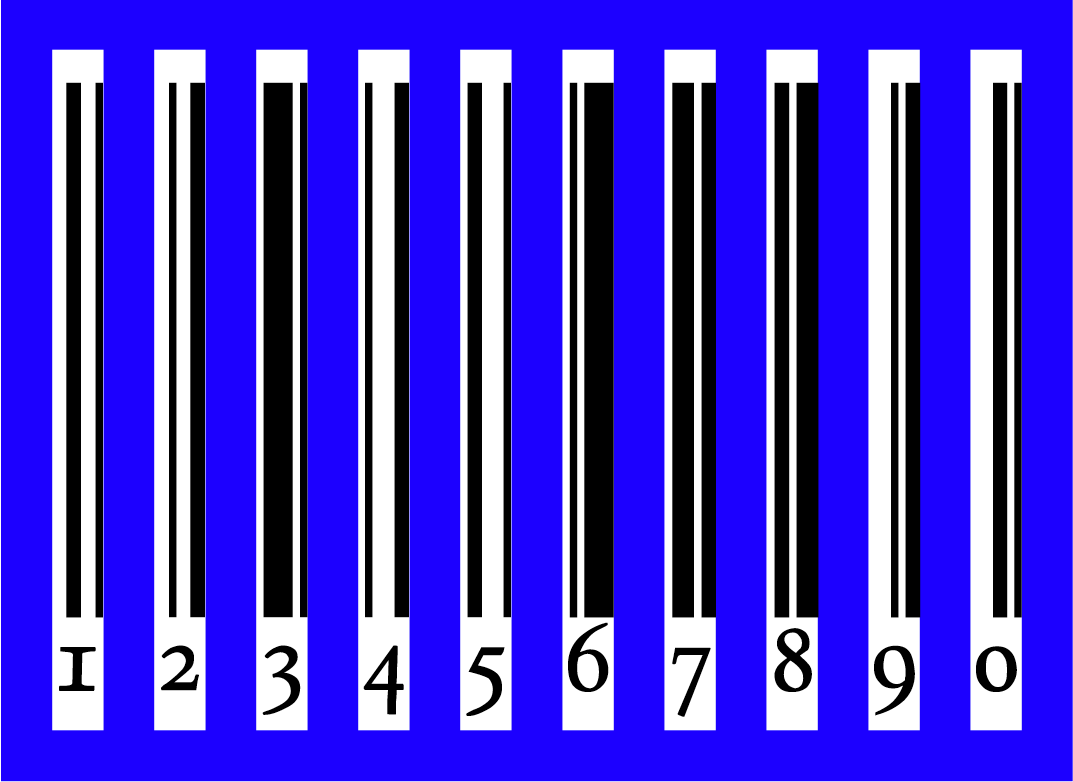
Encoding L-digits

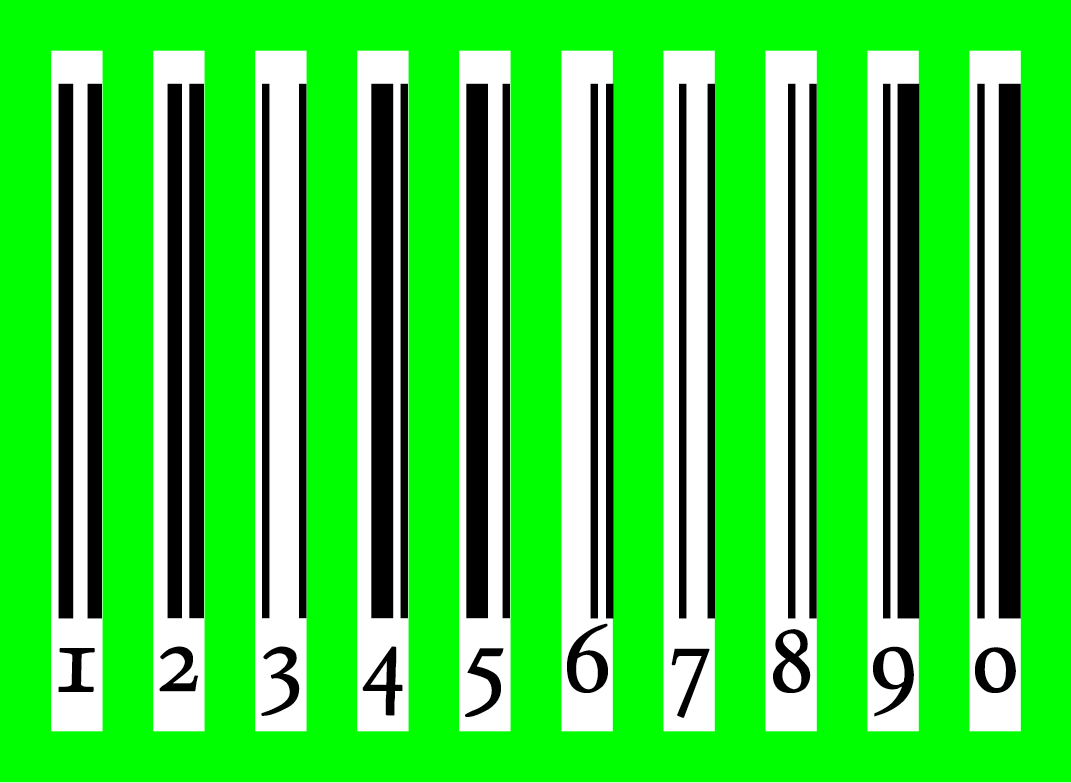
Encoding G-digits

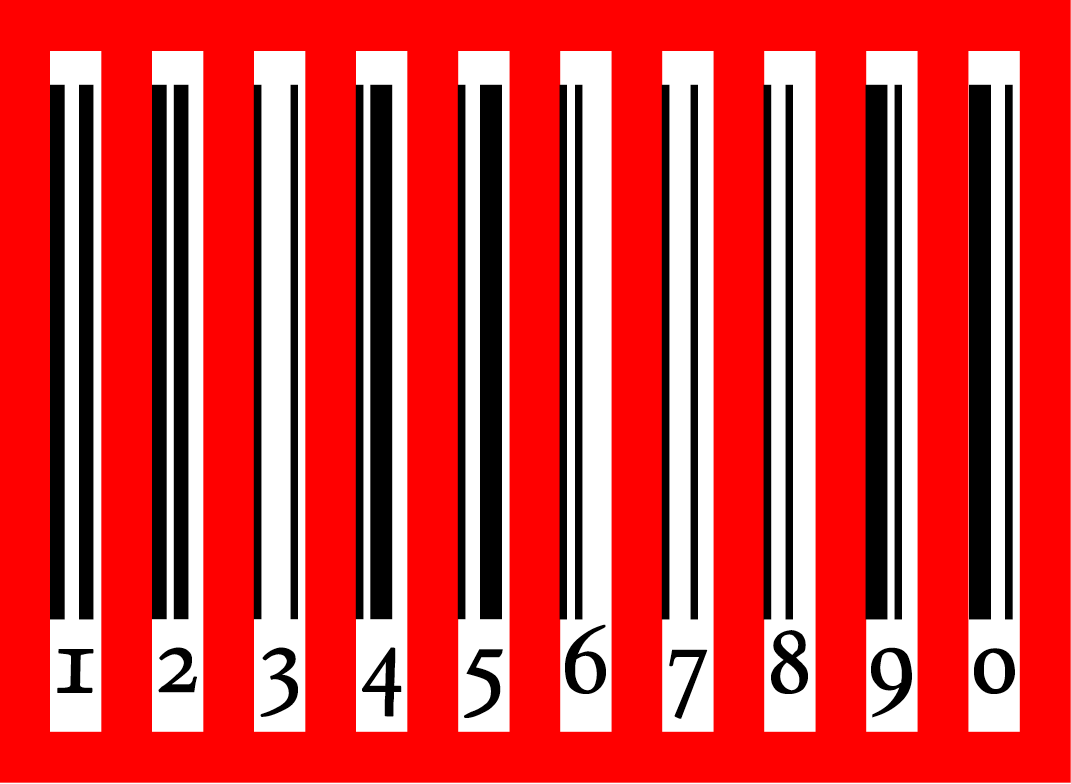
Encoding R-digits

The barcode consists of 95 areas (also called modules) of equal width. Each area can be either white (represented here as 0) or black (represented as 1). From left to right:

- 3 areas for the start marker (101)
- 42 areas (seven per digit) to encode digits 2–7, and to encode digit 1 indirectly, as described in the following section
- 5 areas for the center marker (01010)
- 42 areas (seven per digit) to encode digits 8–13
- 3 areas for the end marker (101)

=== Encoding of the digits ===
To encode the 13-digit EAN-13 number, the digits are split into 3 groups; the first digit, the first group of 6 and the last group of 6. The first group of 6 is encoded using a pattern whereby each digit has two possible encodings, one of which has even parity (denoted with letter G) and one of which has odd parity (denoted with letter L). The first digit is not represented directly by a pattern of bars and spaces, but is encoded indirectly, by selecting a pattern of choices between these two encodings for the first group of 6 digits, according to the table below. All digits in the last group of 6 digits are encoded using a single pattern RRRRRR, the one also used for UPC.

If the first digit is zero, all digits in the first group of 6 are encoded using the pattern LLLLLL used for UPC; therefore, a UPC barcode is also an EAN-13 barcode with the first digit set to zero.

Structure of EAN-13
First digit	First group of 6 digits	Last group of 6 digits
0	LLLLLL	RRRRRR
1	LLGLGG	RRRRRR
2	LLGGLG	RRRRRR
3	LLGGGL	RRRRRR
4	LGLLGG	RRRRRR
5	LGGLLG	RRRRRR
6	LGGGLL	RRRRRR
7	LGLGLG	RRRRRR
8	LGLGGL	RRRRRR
9	LGGLGL	RRRRRR

This encoding guarantees that the first group always starts with an L-code, which has odd parity, and that the second group always starts with an R-code, which has even parity. Thus, it does not matter whether the barcode is scanned from the left or from the right, as the scanning software can use this parity to identify the start and end of the code.

EAN-8 barcodes encode all digits directly, using this scheme:

Structure of EAN-8
First group of 4 digits	Last group of 4 digits
LLLL	RRRR

Encoding of the digits
Digit	L-code	G-code	R-code
0	0001101	0100111	1110010
1	0011001	0110011	1100110
2	0010011	0011011	1101100
3	0111101	0100001	1000010
4	0100011	0011101	1011100
5	0110001	0111001	1001110
6	0101111	0000101	1010000
7	0111011	0010001	1000100
8	0110111	0001001	1001000
9	0001011	0010111	1110100

Note: Entries in the R-column are bitwise complements (logical operator: negation) of the respective entries in the L-column. Entries in the G-column are the entries in the R-column in reverse bit order. See pictures of all codes against a colored background.

A run of one or more black areas is known as a "bar", and a run of one or more white areas is known as a "space". As can be seen in the table, each digit's encoding comprises two bars and two spaces, and the maximum width of a bar or space is four areas.

=== EAN-13 barcode example ===
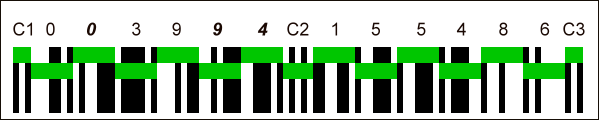
EAN-13 barcode. A green bar indicates the black bars and white spaces that encode a digit.

- C1, C3: Start/end marker.
- C2: Marker for the center of the barcode.
- 6 digits in the left group: 003994.
- 6 digits in the right group (the last digit is the check digit): 155486.
- A digit is encoded in seven areas, by two black bars and two white spaces. Each black bar or white space can have a width between 1 and 4 areas.
- Parity for the digits from left and right group: OEOOEE EEEEEE (O = Odd parity, E = Even parity).
- The first digit in the EAN code: the combination of parities of the digits in the left group indirectly encodes the first digit 4.

The complete EAN-13 code is thus: 4 003994 155486.

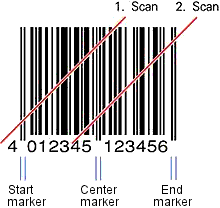
Scanning part of an EAN-13 barcode

=== Decoding ===
By using the barcode center marker, it is possible for a barcode scanner to scan just one half of the barcode at a time. This allows reconstruction of the code by means of a helical scan of the barcode by an angle of approximately 45 degrees.

== Japanese Article Number ==
Japanese Article Number (JAN) is a barcode standard compatible with the EAN. It is a subset of EAN. Use of the JAN standard began in 1978. Originally, JAN was issued a flag code (EAN's number system) of 49. In 1992, JAN was newly issued an additional flag code of 45. In January 2001 the manufacturer code changed to 7 digits (9 digits including the flag code) for new companies.

== See also ==
- EAN-8, another EAN standard
- EAN-5, a supplement for the suggested list price
- EAN-2, a supplement to indicate an issue number
- Electronic Data Interchange
- European Article Numbering-Uniform Code Council
- Global Electronic Party Information Register (GEPIR) a searchable distributed database of GS1 GTINs
- GTIN, the Global Trade Item Number
