= Philippe Gautier =

Book author

Philippe Gautier is the main author of a "book [about] the history of the understanding of the technological, economic, legal and societal stakes or issues of the "Internet of Things". This book is actually an essay on the Future Internet and points out why the contributions of both sciences of complexity and cybernetics are necessary in the conception and realization of information systems to meet the new challenges of sensory technologies - such as NFC, RFID, Barcodes, GPS, etc. - and fully open value chain. This essay discusses also the particular impacts on economics, sociology and governance, with a philosophical conclusion. He is also the founder of Business2Any, a company specialized in the conception & edition of cybernetic software, related to Distributed Artificial Intelligence (DAI), machine learning & cognitive computing for the Internet of Things.

As a chief information officer, he contributed to the implementation of various EPCglobal standardized technologies in Europe including RFID/UHF/GEN2, EPCIS and an independent ONS root (Object Naming Service) pilot programme. The purpose was to manage, in a semi-open loop, the traceability of pallets amongst various logistics players in the supply chain.

He received for his works:

- the “GS1 France 2005” price of innovation
- the SME Award 2006 (Le Monde Informatique)
- two trophies for "CIO 2007" (01 Informatique): "Winner SMEs" and "Jury Special Prize”.

Last, he is a founding member of the SEI (Société européenne de l'Internet/IES France]), regularly writes articles, gives conferences and acts as a consultant for many companies.
