= GS1 EDI =

Set of standards for Electronic Data Interchange

GS1 EDI is a set of global electronic messaging standards for business documents used in Electronic Data Interchange (EDI). The standards are developed and maintained by GS1. GS1 EDI is part of the overall GS1 system, fully integrated with other GS1 standards, increasing the speed and accuracy of the supply chain. Examples of GS1 EDI standards include messages such as: Order, Despatch Advice (Shipping Notice), Invoice, Transport Instruction, etc. The development and maintenance of all GS1 standards is based on a rigorous process called the Global Standard Management Process (GSMP). GS1 develops its global supply chain standards in partnership with the industries using them. Any organization can submit a request to modify the standard. Maintenance releases of GS1 EDI standards are typically published every two years, while code lists can be updated up to 4 times a year.

== Standards ==
GS1 developed the following sets of complementary EDI standards:

- GS1 EANCOM - a subset of UN/EDIFACT, which comprises a set of internationally agreed UN standards, directories and guidelines for EDI. EANCOM is fully compliant to UN/EDIFACT.
- GS1 XML - a GS1 set of electronic messages developed using XML, a language designed for information exchange over internet. GS1 XML is based on UN/CEFACT Core Component Technical Specification (CCTS) and UN/CEFACT Modeling Methodology (UMM).
- GS1 UN/XML - GS1 has also developed its own profiles of four UN/CEFACT XML standards (Cross Industry Order, Order Response, Invoice and Despatch Advice), which are fully compliant with UN/XML.

These groups of standards are being implemented in parallel by various users, GS1 supports and maintains all of them. GS1 EDI standards are designed to work together with other GS1 standards for the identification and labeling of goods, locations, parties and packages. This means that the information and product flows can be combined to provide business with tool enabling traceability, visibility and safety. In EDI, it is essential to unambiguously identify products, services and parties involved in the transaction. In GS1 EDI standard messages, each product, party and location is identified by a unique GS1 identification key, e.g.:

- products by Global Trade Item Number (GTIN)
- parties, such as buyer, seller, and any third parties involved in the transaction as well as locations by Global Location Number (GLN)
- logistic units by Serial Shipping Container Code (SSCC)
- other GS1 ID keys, used e.g. for shipment and consignment identification

Using the GS1 ID Keys enables master data alignment between trading partners before any trading transaction takes place. This ensures data quality, eliminates errors and removes the need to send redundant information in electronic messages (such as product specifications, party addresses, etc.).

== Collaboration with other global standard organizations and industry associations ==
GS1 EDI standards are developed based on other global standards, such as:

- ISO – e.g. code lists re-use
- UN/CEFACT – global methodologies applied, EDIFACT is a base for GS1 EANCOM standard
- W3C – XML syntax

User companies are involved in the development of GS1 standards, either directly or via industry associations, such as The Consumer Goods Forum.

== Implementation of GS1 EDI standards ==
GS1 EDI standards are globally used by companies and organizations from different sectors and applied in various processes like Retail Up- and Downstream, Transport and Warehouse Management, Healthcare, Defense, Finance, Packaging (collaborative artwork development), Cash Handling, public administration and much more.

== See also ==
- List of GS1 member organizations
- Global Trade Item Number
- Global Location Number
- Global Data Synchronization Network (GDSN)
- Serial Shipping Container Code
