= Package tracking =

Process during package sorting and delivery

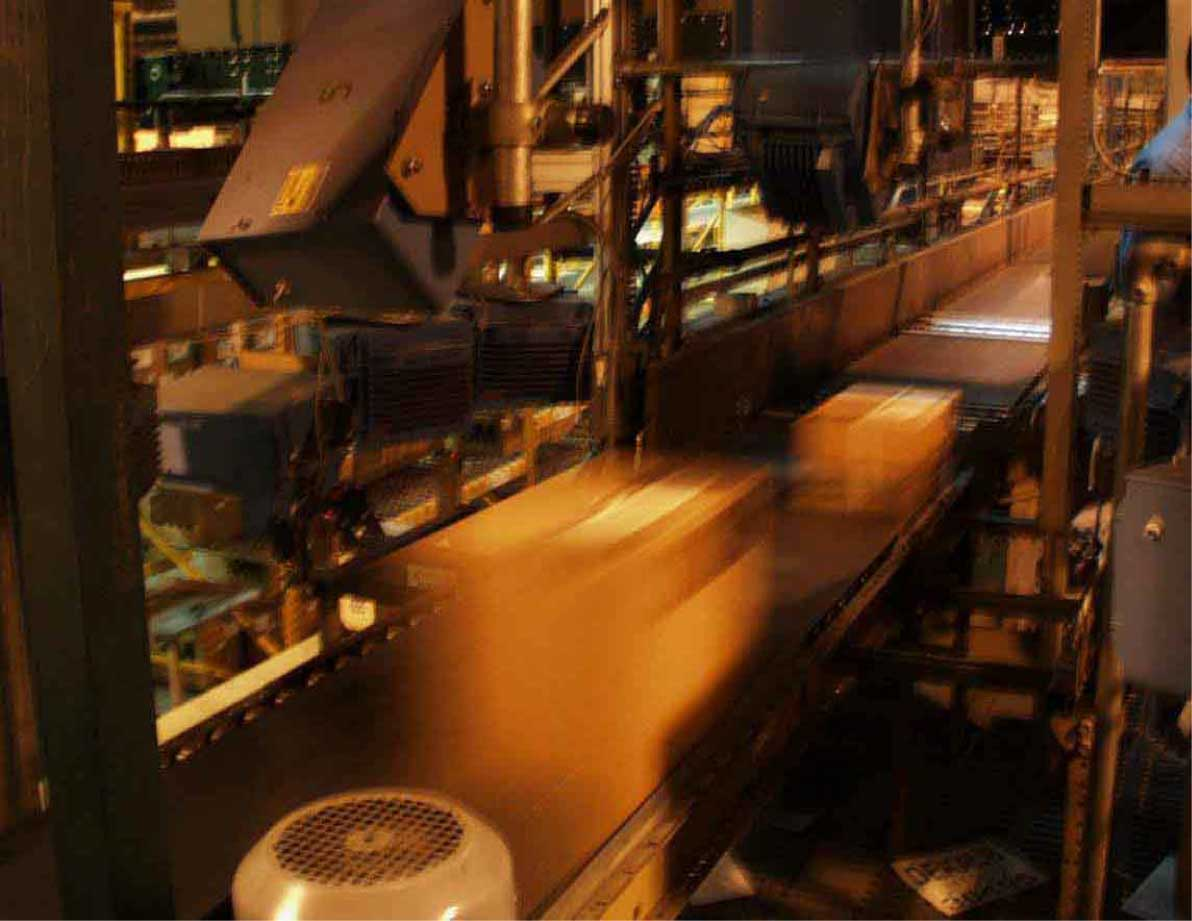
Tracking packages with stationary bar code reader in a warehouse sorting operation

Package tracking or package logging is the process of localizing shipping containers, mail and parcel post at different points of time during sorting, warehousing, and package delivery to verify their provenance and to predict and aid delivery.

Package tracking developed historically because it provided customers information about the route of a package and the anticipated date and time of delivery. This was important because mail delivery often included multiple carriers in varying environmental circumstances, which made it possible for a mail to get lost.

== Identification ==
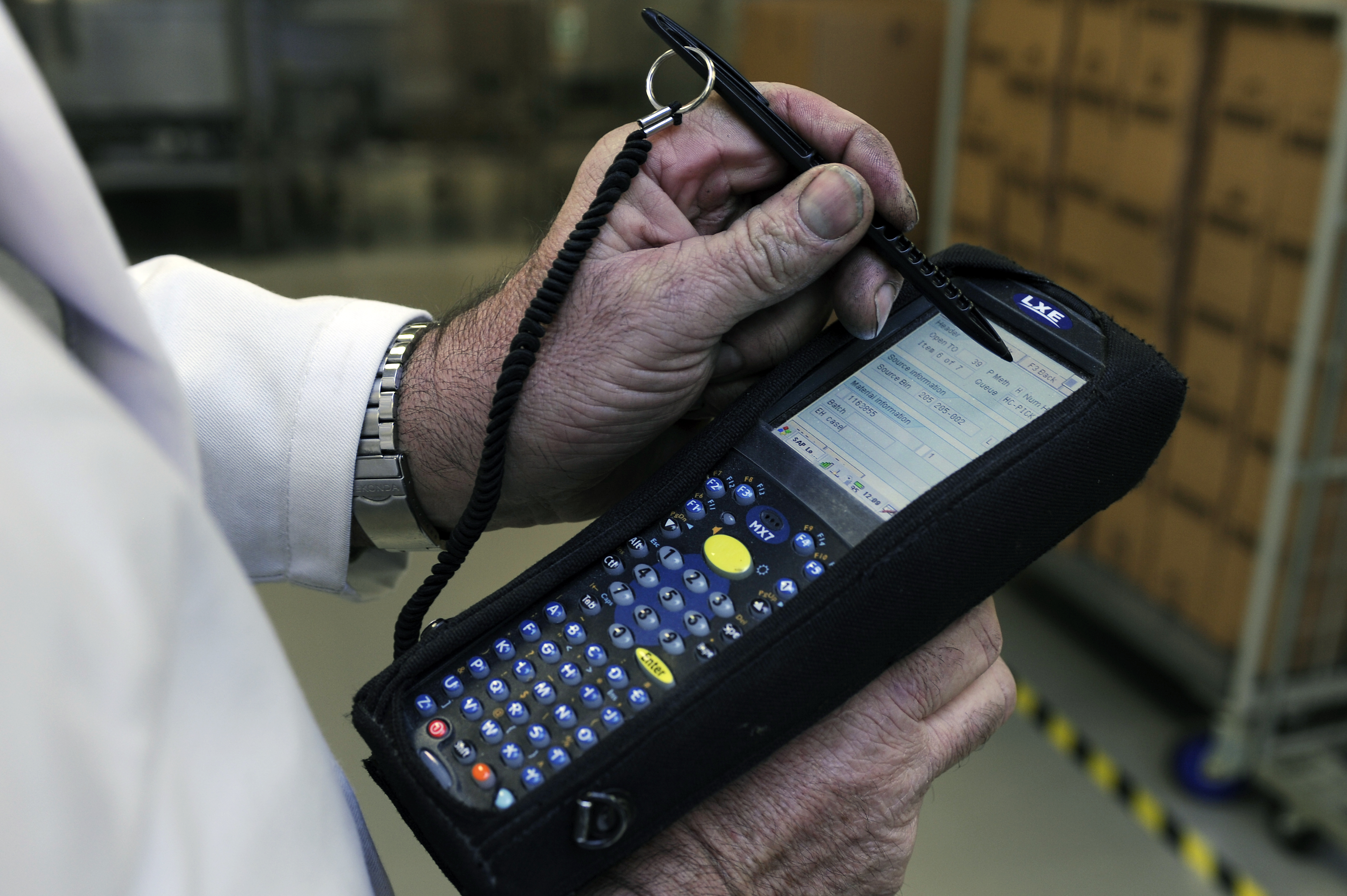
A multifunction barcode scanner being used to monitor the transportation of packages of radioactive pharmaceuticals.

Mail tracking is made possible through certified mail and registered mail, additional postal services that require the identity of a piece of mail to be recorded during various points of delivery, so that the sender can obtain a proof of delivery and the receiver can predict the time of delivery. The service is provided for an additional charge but recently free service has been introduced as the cost of the associated technology has been decreasing.

Initially, a piece of mail was identified by the sending date and the addresses of the sender and the recipient; later tracking numbers came to be used for identification. Traceability has been improved even further by barcoding: by non-specific 1D linear barcodes and 2D matrix barcodes and specialized augmented postal codes such as Postal Alpha Numeric Encoding Technique (PLANET), Postal Numeric Encoding Technique (POSTNET) and Intelligent Mail barcode, and other electronic product codes (EPC-s).

== Methods ==
To identify the location of the mail, two methods have been used. One approach involves reporting the arrival or departure of the package and recording the identity of the package, the location, the time, and the status. This approach has been used for package tracking provided by the delivery companies, such as Deutsche Post, United Parcel Service, AirRoad, or FedEx. Another approach is to use a GPS-based vehicle tracking system and nowadays Beacons to locate the vehicle that contains the package and record it in a real-time database. A third, not as yet released, method involves real-time self-reporting by a package of its location; an illustration of this is the bluetooth-enabled adhesive Samsara Tracking Label, a paper-thin label with a 45-day integrated non-lithium battery, targeted for use in the United States.

As package tracking technologies have evolved, it has also become possible to increase the amount of information and metrics returned about a package and to report beside its location also temperature, humidity, pressure, acceleration, elevation and exposure to light at different time points—factors that are important for delicate or perishable contents.

== Querying and reporting ==
Web-based package tracking has been used from the early days of the Internet to automate customer service and as a cheaper alternative to phone-based call centers, providing the ability to track the status of a package "within minutes". The service became quickly popular: for UPS the number of packages tracked on the web increased from 600 a day in 1995 to 3.3 million a day in 1999. On-line package tracking became available for all major carrier companies, and was improved by the emergence of websites that offered consolidated tracking for different mail carriers. With the rise of smart phones, package tracking mobile apps were able to send tracking info to customers' cell phones. With improved data processing, e-mail programs were able to automatically detect tracking numbers in messages and receipts and print the real time location of the package.

== Internal package tracking ==
Most traditional package tracking systems do not track packages after a package is dropped off at a centralized mail services center with single-point delivery, such as the ones used at apartment complexes, college residence halls, corporate mailrooms, post-office box stores and mail and parcel centers. These mail services centers receive all incoming mail and sort it; the mail may then be delivered to individual recipients or the recipients may have to pick up the mail themselves. To cover that gap and track a package at different points within the internal delivery process, specialized internal or "inbound" package tracking systems have been developed.

These systems log in the packages that arrive by recording the items from different carrier companies, the time the delivery is made, the name of the recipient, tracking number and other data. The recipients are notified of the packages or sent reminders. Once the package is received by the end recipient, the systems record the timestamp, the recipient signature and method of authentication and the package is logged out.

Several technologies have evolved with slightly different features (Winn Solutions or WITS, PackageLog, PakLog, SCLogic, TekTrack, Oden Industries, Inc. (PacTrac), WTS by Quadient and others), including patented solutions.

== See also ==
- Track and trace
- Digital mailroom
- Registered mail
