= Unique identifier =

Identifier that is unique among all used identifiers

A unique identifier (UID) is an identifier that is guaranteed to be unique among all identifiers used for those objects and for a specific purpose. The concept was formalized early in the development of computer science and information systems. In general, it was associated with an atomic data type.

In relational databases, certain attributes of an entity that serve as unique identifiers are called primary keys. In mathematics, set theory uses the concept of element indices as unique identifiers.

== Classification ==
There are some main types of unique identifiers, each corresponding to a different generation strategy:

1. serial numbers, assigned incrementally or sequentially, by a central authority or accepted reference.
2. random numbers, selected from a number space much larger than the maximum (or expected) number of objects to be identified. Although not really unique, some identifiers of this type may be appropriate for identifying objects in many practical applications and are, with informal use of language, still referred to as "unique"
  1. Hash functions: based on the content of the identified object, ensuring that equivalent objects use the same UID.
  2. Random number generator: based on random process.
3. names or codes allocated by choice which are forced to be unique by keeping a central registry such as the EPC Information Services.
4. names or codes allocated using a regime involving multiple (concurrent) issuers of unique identifiers that are each assigned mutually exclusive partitions of a global address space such that the unique identifiers assigned by each issuer in each exclusive address space partition are guaranteed to be globally unique. Examples include (1) the media access control address MAC address uniquely assigned to each individual hardware network interface device produced by the manufacturer of the devices, (2) consumer product bar codes assigned to products using identifiers assigned by manufacturers that participate in GS1 identification standards, and (3) the unique and persistent Legal Entity Identifier assigned to a legal entity by one of the LEI registrars in the Global Legal Entity Identifier System (GLEIS) managed by the Global LEI Foundation (GLEIF).

The above methods can be combined, hierarchically or singly, to create other generation schemes which guarantee uniqueness. In many cases, a single object may have more than one unique identifier, each of which identifies it for a different purpose.

== Examples ==
- Electronic Identifier Serial Publication (EISP)
- Electronic Product Code (EPC)
- International eBook Identifier Number (IEIN)
- International Standard Book Number (ISBN)
- National identification number
- Amazon Standard Identification number
- Part number
- Radio call signs
- Stock keeping unit (SKU)
- Track and trace

=== National identification number ===
National identification number is used by the governments of many countries as a means of tracking their citizens, permanent residents, and temporary residents for the purposes of work, taxation, government benefits, health care, and other governance-related functions.

=== Chemistry ===
- CAS registry number
- IUPAC nomenclature

=== Computing ===
- Cryptographic hashes
- Identity correlation
- MAC address
- Object identifier (OID)
- Organizationally unique identifier (OUI)
- Universally unique identifier (UUID) or globally unique identifier (GUID)
- World Wide Port Name

=== Economics, tax and regulation ===
- Harmonized System
- Payment card number
- Unique Transaction Identifier (UTI)
- Universal Product Code

=== Internet architecture and standards ===
- Best Current Practice (BCP)
- For Your Information (FYI)
- Internet Draft (I-D)
- Internet Experiment Note (IEN)
- Internet Standard (STD)
- Request for Comments (RFC)
- RARE Technical Reports (RTR)

=== Legal ===
- Bates numbering
- European Case Law Identifier (ECLI)
- Gun serial number
- Legal Entity Identifier (LEI)
- Lex (URN)

=== Mathematical publications ===
- Mathematical Reviews number
- Zentralblatt MATH identifier

=== Research / Science ===
- Archival Resource Keys (ARK), with 8.2 billion ARKs issued.
- Digital object identifiers (DOI), with 200 million DOIs issued.
- Identifiers.org
- ORCID (Open Researcher and Contributor ID)
- Smithsonian trinomial
- Systematic name

=== Transportation ===
- American rail transportation Reporting marks
- IMO number to identify sea-going ships
- International Air Transport Association airport codes
- IMO container codes according to ISO 6346 for shipping containers
- License plate number
- Maritime Mobile Service Identity (MMSI)
- UIC wagon numbers

== See also ==
- Numbering scheme
