= Track and trace =

Product locating technologies in logistics

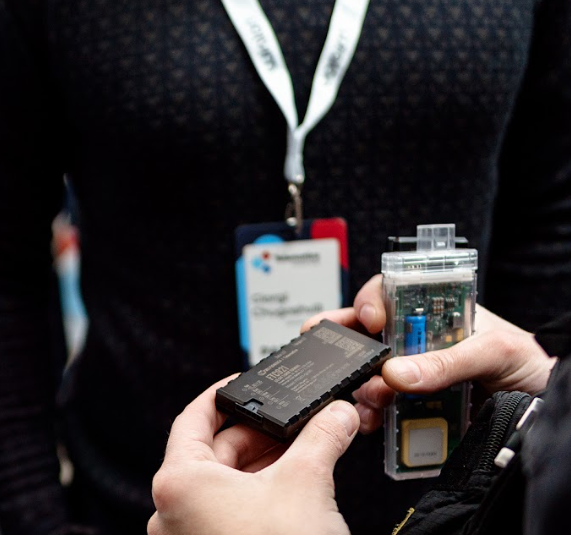
A portable GPS tracking device, with a second unit in a transparent case showing its internal circuitry.

In the distribution and logistics of many types of products, track and trace or tracking and tracing, a type of tracking system that determines the current and past locations and other information of a unique item or property. Mass serialization is the process of assigning and marking each product with a unique identifier, such as an Electronic Product Code (EPC), for track and trace purposes. The marking or "tagging" of products is usually completed within the manufacturing process through various combinations of human-readable or machine-readable technologies such as DataMatrix barcodes or RFID.

The track and trace concept is part of modern telematics and can be supported by a vehicle tracking system. This often relies on automatic vehicle location technology for vehicles and containers for the property of concern, with data stored in a real-time database. This data, a form of telemetry, is used for fleet management to compose a coherent depiction of status reports.

Another approach is to report the arrival or departure of the object, recording its identification, location, time, and status. This method requires verifying the reports for consistency and completeness. An example of this is the package tracking provided by shippers, such as the United States Postal Service, Deutsche Post, Royal Mail, United Parcel Service, AirRoad, or FedEx.

== Technology ==
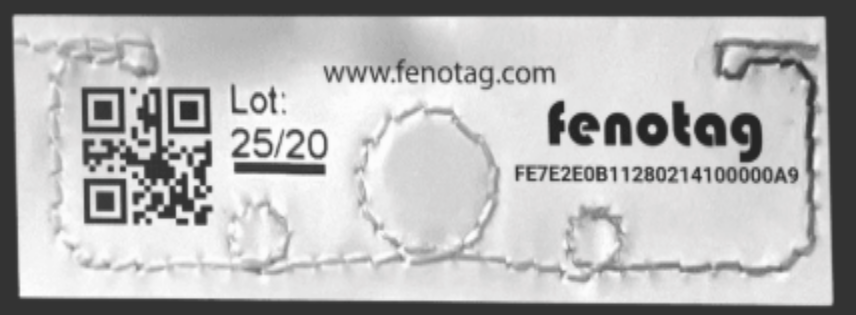
Textil RFID tag for laundry with printed EPC and barcode

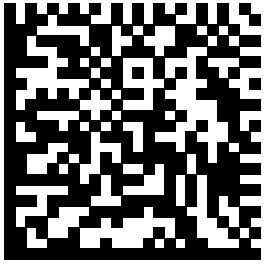
Some produce traceability makers use matrix barcodes to record data on specific produce.

The international standards organization EPCglobal under GS1 has ratified the EPC network standards (esp. the EPC information services EPCIS standard), which codify the syntax and semantics for supply chain events and the secure method for selectively sharing supply chain events with trading partners. These standards for tracking and tracing have been used in deployments in many industries, and many products are certified as compatible with them. In vehicular applications, tracking is often accomplished using a GPS tracking unit which communicates through a telematic control unit. More advanced systems incorporate video telematics, using devices like a dashcam to provide visual context for tracking events.

In response to an increasing number of recall incidents for items like food, pharmaceuticals, and toys, vendors offer a range of traceability solutions and tools. Radio-frequency identification and barcodes are two common technologies used to deliver traceability.

RFID is often used in track-and-trace solutions and within supply chains. As a code-carrying technology, it can be used in place of a barcode to enable non-line-of-sight reading. The deployment of RFID was earlier inhibited by cost, but its usage is now increasing.

Barcoding is a common and cost-effective method used to implement traceability at both the item and case level. Variable data in a barcode or a numeric or alphanumeric code format can be applied to the packaging or label. The data can be used as a pointer to traceability information and can also correlate with production data such as time to market and product quality.

Packaging converters have a choice of three different classes of technology to print barcodes:

- Inkjet (dot on demand or continuous) systems are capable of printing high-resolution (300 dpi or higher for dot on demand) images at press speed (up to 1000fpm). These solutions can be deployed either on-press or off-line.
- Laser marking can be employed to ablate a coating or to cause a color change in certain materials. The advantage of lasers is fine detail and high speed for character printing, with no consumables. Not all substrates accept a laser mark, and certain colors (e.g., red) are not suitable for barcode reading.
- Thermal transfer and direct thermal. For lower-speed off-press applications, thermal transfer and direct thermal printers are ideal for printing variable data on labels.

== Uses ==
Serialization supports supply chain agility, providing visibility into supply chain activities and the ability to take responsive action. Benefits include the ability to recognize and isolate counterfeit products and to improve the efficiency of product recall management.

Consumers can access websites to trace the origins of their purchased products or to find the status of shipments. A user can type a code found on an item into a search box at a tracing website to view information. This can also be done via a smartphone by taking a picture of a 2D barcode, which opens a website that verifies the product (i.e., product authentication).

Serialization is used for safety in the pharmaceutical industry, where it is often legally required.

The same tracking principles are also used in wider intelligent transportation systems, in public transport to provide real-time arrival information, and to help power journey planners.

== See also ==
- Drug distribution
- Mobile asset management
- Real-time locating system
