= Extreme Blue =

Internship program at IBM

IBM Extreme Blue
- Company type: Internship Program
- Founded: 1999
- Headquarters: 15 active, 18 total See List
- Area served: World Wide
- Founders: David Grossman, Jane Harper, Ronald Woan, Sean Martin, Morris Matsa
- Parent: IBM
- Website: https://www.ibm.com/training/badge/ibm-extreme-blue
- Current status: Active

Extreme Blue is one of IBM's internship program for both graduate and undergraduate students; it also serves as a placement opportunity for future IBM employment due to the significant effort put into placement of the interns.

== History ==
Extreme Blue was created in 1999 by David Grossman, Jane Harper, Ronald Woan, Sean Martin, Morris Matsa. It began at the Lotus Development site in Cambridge, Massachusetts. In 2003, Extreme Blue participants filed 98 patents.

In 2007, 10,000 applications were received for 92 positions in the U.S.; over 10,000 students applied for 220 positions worldwide. At the 2008 National Council for Work Experience (NCWE) award ceremony, the UK Extreme Blue program received the "Over 250 Employees – Short term placement" award. In 2009, according to an Extreme Blue manager, over 10,000 applications were received for fewer than 50 US positions.

Since its inception, the program has expanded to include 15 active international locations.

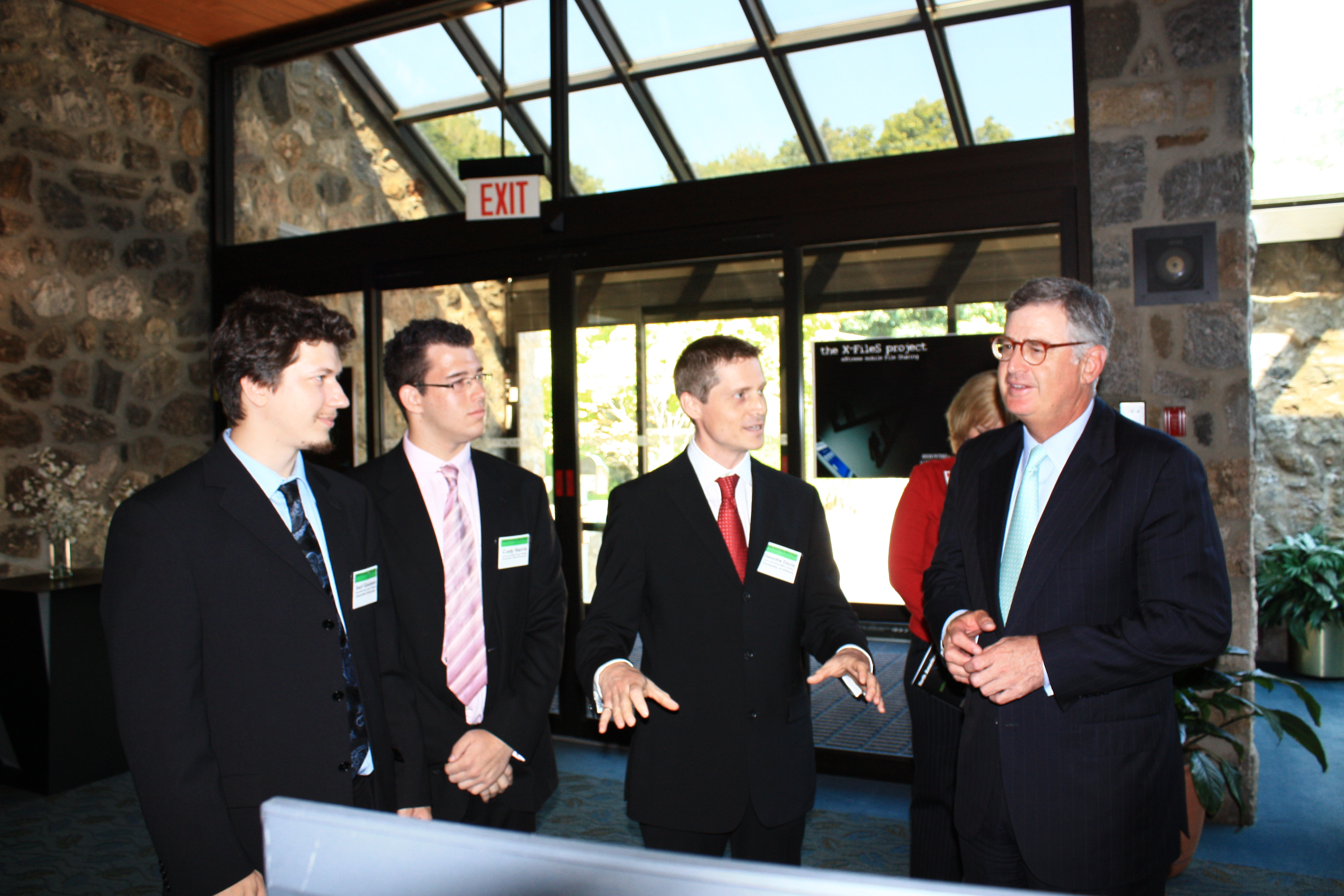
Former IBM CEO Samuel J. Palmisano, now chairman (far right) speaking with interns at Extreme Blue in 2009

== Projects ==
Extreme Blue uses IBM engineers, interns, and business managers to develop technology and business plans for new products and services. Each summer an Extreme Blue team also works on a project. These projects mostly involve rapid prototyping of high-profile software and hardware projects. Publicly released projects include the following:

- AmalgamR (2009) amalgamates social information from multiple sources, including Twitter, and displays relevant and timely group-based information.
- BreadCrumbs (2009) is an iPhone application that scans grocery food barcodes and gives consumers information such as ingredients, manufacturing history, and product recall alerts with the use of food traceability servers.
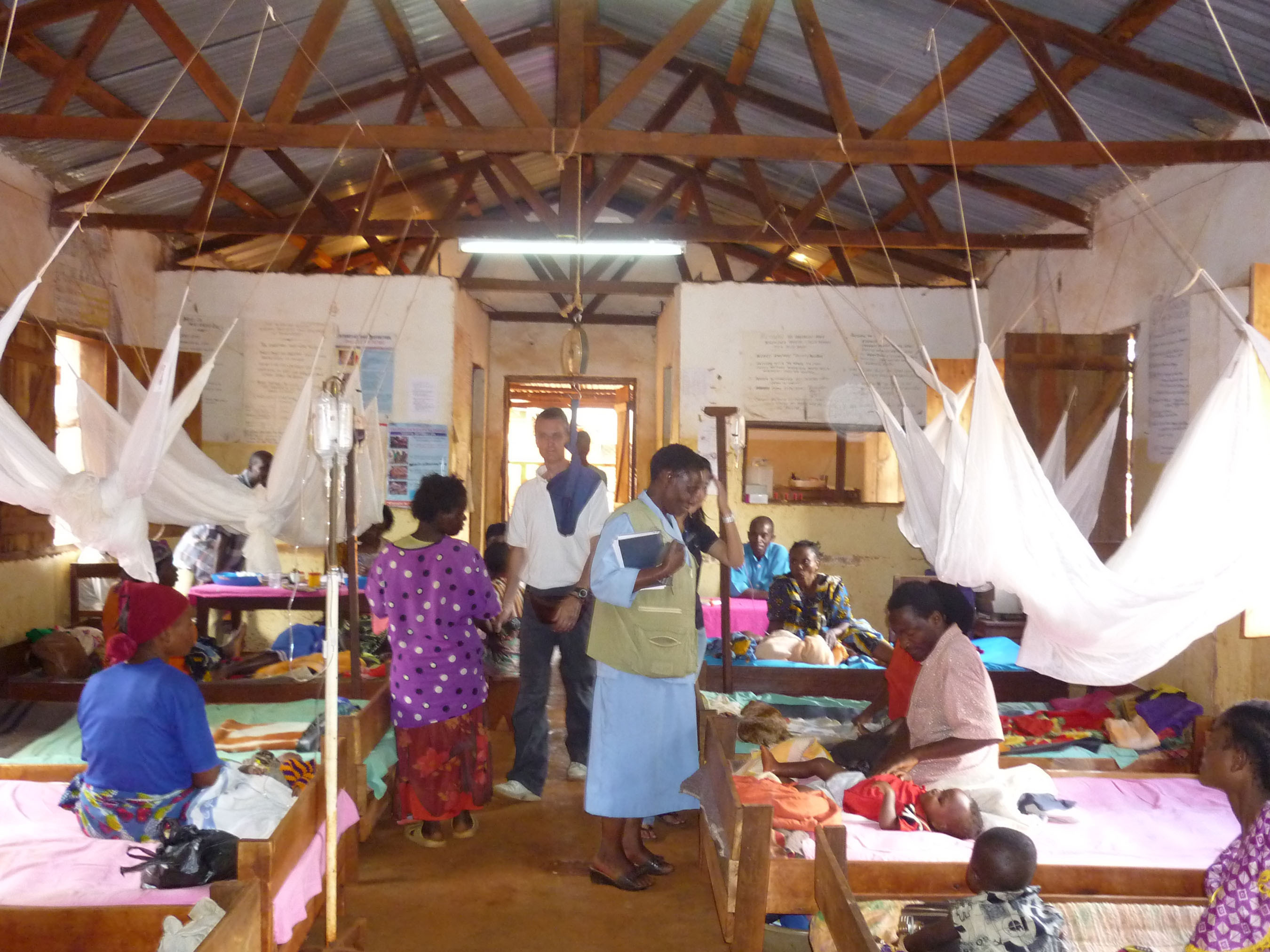
  Malaria Clinic in Tanzania helped by SMS for Life program, an Extreme Blue project
- SMS for Life (2009) fights malaria in Africa by utilizing cell phones, texting and web mapping technology to track and manage antimalarial drugs.
- exSEL (2007) is an end-to-end marketing tool which provides a virtual tour and allows virtual interactions with the exhibits in the IBM Solutions Experience Lab.
- SiSi Say It Sign It (2007) converts from spoken English directly into British Sign Language which is then signed by an animated digital character or avatar.
- Peridot (2004) checks web sites for broken links and assist in updating them. IBM applied for two patents on this technology.
- GameGrid (2003) created a distributed computing MMOG based on the open-source version of ID Software's Quake 2 first-person shooter.

== Laboratory locations ==
=== North America ===
In 2004, there were 44 Extreme Blue teams in North America. In 2002, there were 101 interns in North America from 42 schools.

- (United States) IBM Almaden Research Center located in San Jose, California, USA (2000-current)
  - 4 teams in 2009
- (United States) IBM Silicon Valley Lab located in San Jose, California, USA
- (United States) Cambridge, Massachusetts, USA (1999–2004)
  - Debut location of Extreme Blue
  - Did not host EB in 2001.
- (United States) Raleigh, North Carolina, USA (2002–current)
  - Started 2002
  - Lab manager:
    - (2006-current) Ross Grady
- (United States) Austin, Texas, USA (2001-current)
  - Started 2001
  - Lab manager:
    - (2015-current) Marjean Fieldhouse
  - Technical lead:
    - (2015-current) Matthew Glover
- Montreal, Quebec, Canada
- Ottawa, Ontario, Canada
- Toronto, Ontario, Canada

=== South America ===
- São Paulo, Brazil

=== Asia ===
- Beijing, China
- Bangalore, India (2004–?)
  - Started in 2004 with 9 students in 2 teams
- Delhi, India (2010–current)
  - Started in 2010 and is currently active.
- IBM Haifa Research Laboratory located in Haifa, Israel

=== Europe ===
- (Republic of Ireland) Dublin, Ireland
- (Republic of Ireland) Cork, Ireland
- Böblingen, Germany
  - 3 teams in 2002
- Brussels, Belgium
- Amsterdam, Netherlands
- Uithoorn, Netherlands
- La Gaude, France
- Hursley, United Kingdom
- Zurich, Switzerland
- Rome, Italy
