= IBM RFID Information Center =

The IBM RFID Information Center (RFIDIC) software solution is based on EPCglobal's Electronic Product Code Information Services (EPCIS) standard specification. RFID Information Center enables tracking of uniquely identifiable (serialized) product throughout the supply chain. Despite the name, the RFID Information Center is sensor agnostic, meaning it recognizes product serialized with RFID, barcode and/or 2D barcode. This IBM WebSphere middleware offering is a software product that falls within IBM's broader IBM Information Management Software line.

== History ==
The first version was released in 2006, with further iterations released through 2008.

== Features ==
Publicized features include shipping verification, ePedigree, which allows for tracking pharmaceuticals through the supply chain, and information management.
