= Location number =

Location number may refer to:

- Global Location Number, part of the GS1 systems of standards
- Location number (book), a method for displaying citeable page numbers in e-books
