= Top 10 Produce =

American produce trademark

Top 10 is a produce trademark that is restricted in its use to small independent American farms. In a press release dated June 1, 2009, the company that owns the brand (Top 10 Produce LLC) announced it was the first "100% traceable produce brand" The brand was created to encourage smaller growers in areas such as Salinas Valley, California, to work together to market item-level traceable produce directly to consumers. Most of the smaller farms selling under the brand sell a significant portion of their produce locally, as "locally grown" produce. The ability of the consumer to verify the actual location of the grower is a brand feature highlighted by the claim of 100% item level traceability.

The trademark name “Top 10" references the fact that most growers have a highest quality grade, which they call their “Top” label. The "10" comes from the fact that the brand encourages all growers to contribute at least 10% of their crop to sell to their local market under the Top 10 brand, while using other brands for produce sold out of their local area. The brand went national in June 2009 and declared itself as "the small farm brand" dedicated to serving as an advocate for smaller local growers "from coast to coast". Top 10 was designated as a “brand of brands” and as such it will only license independent growers who own or lease the land on which the produce is grown and each grower selling under the brand is encouraged to retain and promote what makes them unique. By labeling each item contributed with a Databar and by using “extended packaging” the brand was designed so that consumers could use computers or mobile devices (such as iPhones) to learn about the grower, the sustainability of the growing practices, and where the produce was grown.

Top 10 is 100 percent traceable to the item level and exceeds the Case level traceability recommended by the Produce Traceability Initiative (PTI). The brand makes items sold under the label traceable by assigning each produce item with a unique 14-digit number issued by GS1. When that produce item goes in a case, that case is also assigned a 14-digit number. The brand shares those 14-digit numbers with all of the grower's trading partners. Both the items and the cases have barcodes with the 14-digit numbers and other more specific information encoded into them. These barcodes can be scanned and tracked using the same system that is endorsed by the Produce Traceability Initiative, using software available from numerous specialized software vendors.

Some competing supermarkets, including Wal-Mart in the United States and Tesco in the UK, already use the Databar technology in their business models.
