= PML =

PML may refer to:

- Pakistan Muslim League, several Pakistani political parties
- Partido Movimiento Libertario, libertarian political party in Costa Rica
- Plymouth Marine Laboratory, England
- Probable maximum loss, in insurance

== Locations ==
- Pine Mountain Lake, California, Groveland, United States

== Biology and Medicine ==
- Polymorphonuclear leucocyte, white blood cell
- Progressive multifocal leukoencephalopathy, rare and usually fatal disorder
- Promyelocytic leukemia protein, tumor suppressor protein

== Technology ==
- Programmable Macro Language, for Aveva industrial plant design
- Provenance Markup Language, for provenance exchange
- Physical Markup Language in XML
- Physical Measurement Laboratory, a US NIST laboratory
- Perfectly matched layer, in wave equations
