= ASN =

ASN or Asn may refer to:

== Organisations ==
- ASN Bank, in the Netherlands
- Alcatel Submarine Networks
- American Society of Nephrology
- American Society for Neurochemistry
- American Society for Nutrition
- Archstone (former ticker symbol), a US real estate investment trust
- Association for the Study of Nationalities, an association devoted to the study of ethnicity and nationalism
- Autorité de sûreté nucléaire, the French nuclear safety authority
- Assistant Secretary of the Navy, the title given to certain civilian senior officials in the United States Department of the Navy
- Australasian Steam Navigation Company, shipping company operating between 1839 and 1887

== Computing ==
- Abstract Syntax Notation One (ASN.1)
- Autonomous System Number, an identifier for a collection of IP networks and routers under the control of one entity
- Access service network, a component in telecommunications networks; See Access network
- asn, the second-level domain name .au, reserved for Australian associations and non-profit organisations
- Address space number, a tag of an Alpha translation lookaside buffer entry

== Media ==
- American Sports Network, a syndicated package of college sports originated by Sinclair Broadcast Group
- All Sports Network, a 24-hour Pan Asian sports channel owned by Yes Television
- Associated Screen News of Canada, producer of newsreels, shorts and industrial films in Canada in the period of 1920 to 1958
- Atlantic Satellite Network, a television channel in Canada now known as CTV Two Atlantic

== Transportation ==
- Advance ship notice, a message used to notify of pending deliveries
- Addlestone railway station (National Rail code), UK
- Aviation Safety Network, a website that keeps track of aviation accidents, incidents, and hijackings
- Talladega Municipal Airport (IATA: ASN), an airport in Alabama, US
- Asansol Junction railway station (station code: ASN), West Bengal, India

== Other uses ==
- Adobe Solutions Network, the brand name for worldwide partner programs of Adobe Systems, Inc
- American State National, the name used by a subgroup of the sovereign citizen movement
- Asparagine (Asn), an amino acid
- Associate of Science in Nursing, a tertiary education nursing degree which typically takes 2–3 years to complete
- Additional Support Needs, a Scottish term equivalent to special needs in the Education (Additional Support for Learning) (Scotland) Act 2004
