= SSCC =

SSCC may refer to

- Serial Shipping Container Code maintained by GS1
- Silver State Classic Challenge, an Open Road Racing event in Nevada
- Siren Song of the Counter Culture, an album by Rise Against
- Smurfit-Stone Container
- Songshan Cultural and Creative Park, a multi-functional park in Taipei, Taiwan
- Southern State Community College in Ohio
- Sulphide stress corrosion cracking
