= GLN =

GLN may refer to:

- General linear group
- Glenview Railroad Station, in Illinois, United States
- Global Location Number
- Gln (or Q), abbreviation for the amino acid glutamine
- Gln, abbreviation for Glen in street addresses
- Guelmim Airport, in Morocco
