= 4011 =

4011 may refer to:

- 4011, a 4000-series integrated circuit consisting of quad 2-input NAND gates
- 4011, the PLU code for bananas
