= Metadirectory =

A metadirectory system provides for the flow of data between one or more directory services and databases in order to maintain synchronization of that data. It is an important part of identity management systems.

The data being synchronized typically are collections of entries that contain user profiles and possibly authentication or policy information. Most metadirectory deployments synchronize data into at least one LDAP-based directory server, to ensure that LDAP-based applications such as single sign-on and portal servers have access to recent data, even if the data is mastered in a non-LDAP data source.

Metadirectory products support filtering and transformation of data in transit.

Most identity management suites from commercial vendors include a metadirectory product, or a user provisioning product.

== See also ==
- Virtual directory
- Identity correlation
- Microsoft Identity Integration Server
- NetIQ Identity Manager
- Critical Path Metadirectory
