= Application Level Events =

Application Level Events (ALE) is a standard created by EPCglobal, an organization of industry leaders devoted to the development of standards for the Electronic Product Code (EPC) and Radio-frequency identification (RFID) technologies and standards. The ALE specification is a software specification indicating required functionality and behavior, as well as a common API expressed through XML Schema Definition (XSD) and Web Services Description Language (WSDL).
