= Price look-up code =

Number to identify produce in grocery stores

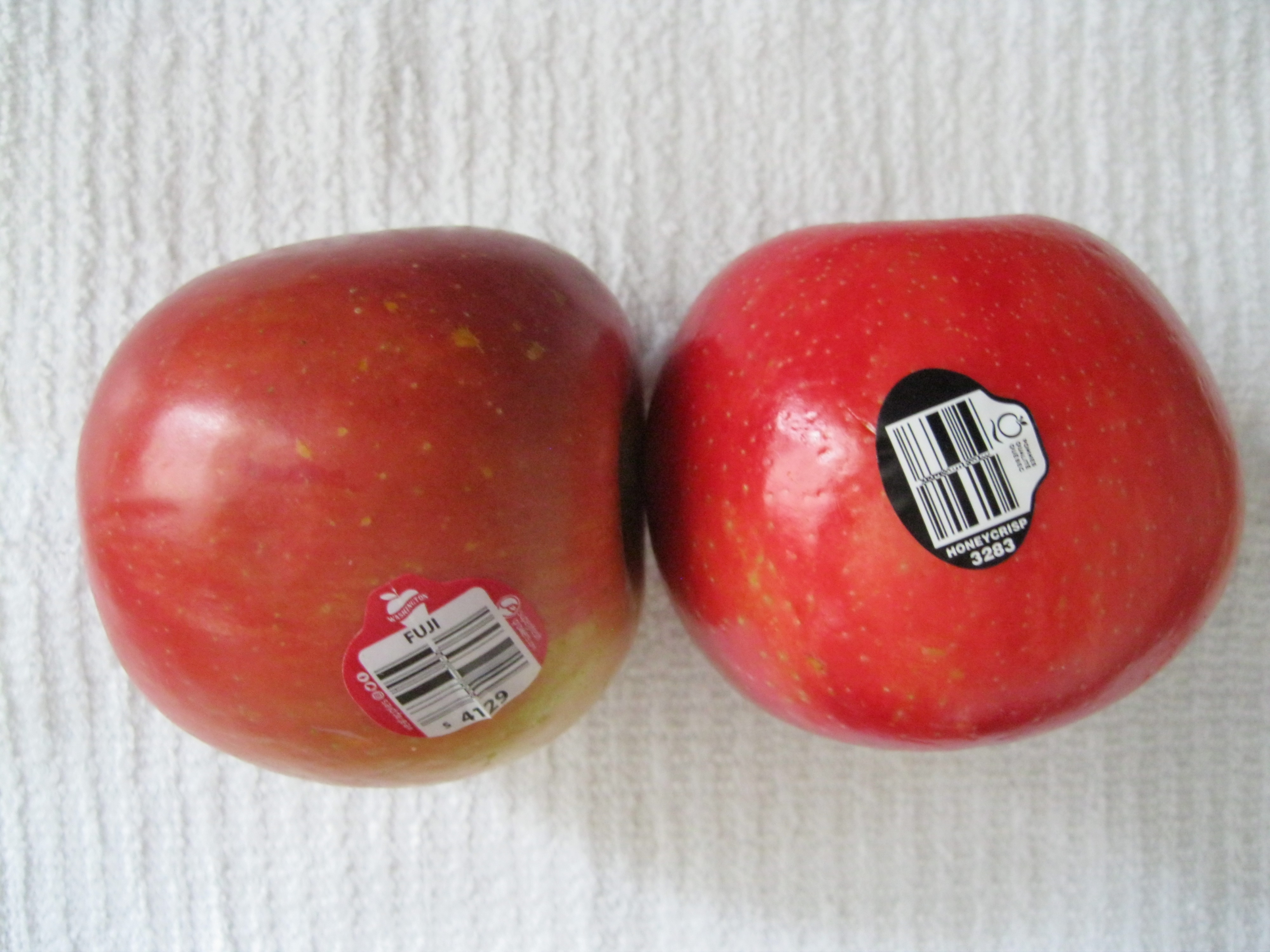
A Fuji and Honeycrisp apple with their PLU stickers visible.

Price look-up codes, commonly called PLU codes, PLU numbers, PLUs, produce codes, or produce labels, are a system of numbers that uniquely identify bulk produce sold in grocery stores and supermarkets. The codes have been in use since 1990, and over 1,400 have been assigned. The codes are administered by the International Federation for Produce Standards (IFPS), a global coalition of fruit and vegetable associations that was formed in 2001 to introduce PLU numbers globally.

Produce labeled with PLU codes eliminates the need for grocery store checkers and customers to visually identify different varieties, which can make check-out and inventory control easier, faster, and more accurate, something that is important when varieties of produce look similar, but have different prices, such as organic and conventional (non-organic) varieties.

== Uses ==
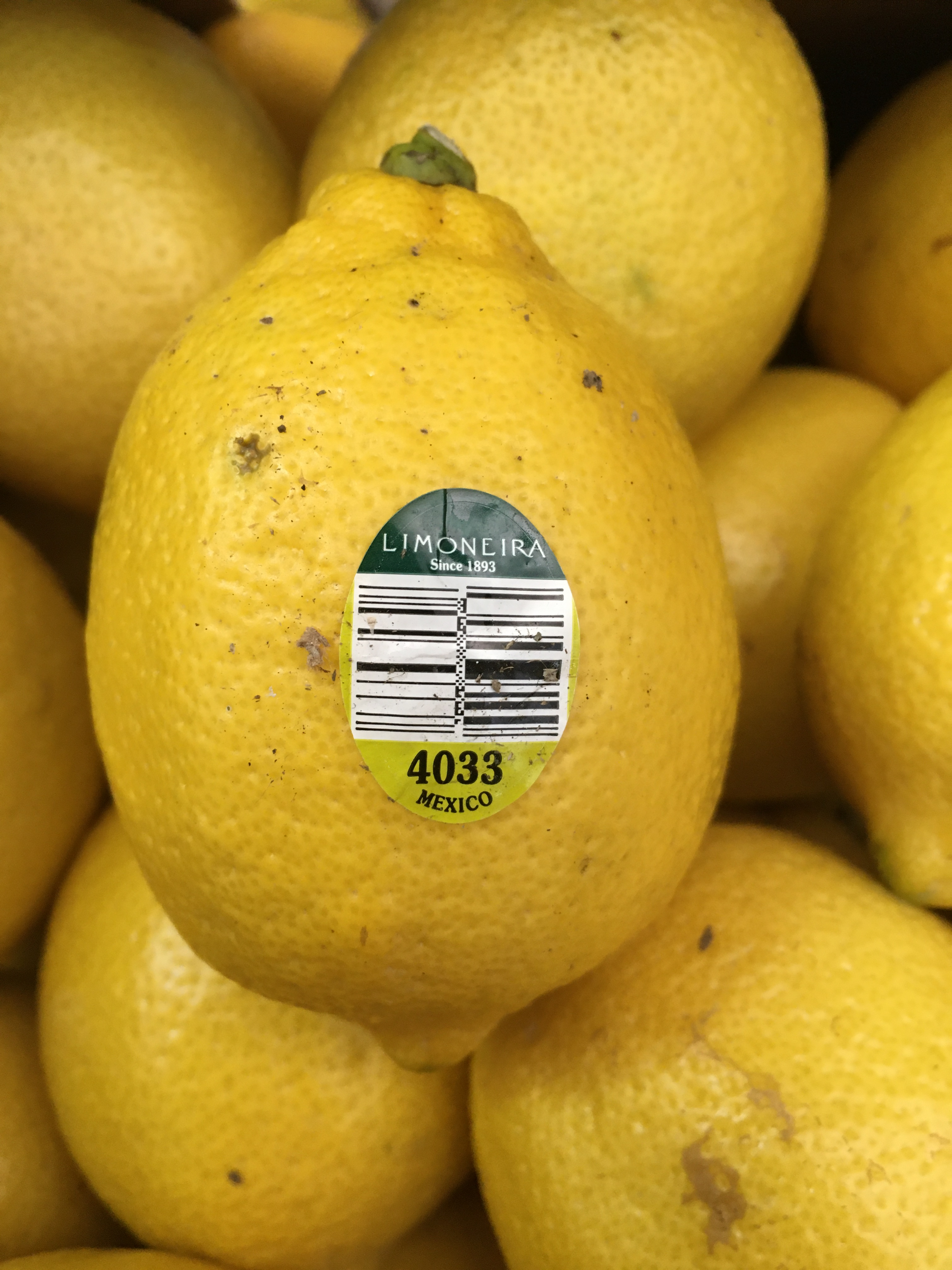
PLU code 4033 is for a regular small lemon sold in the U.S.

PLU codes are used primarily in retail grocery stores or supermarkets, where they are keyed into point of sale systems by cashiers or by customers at self-checkout machines when the produce is being weighed or counted. The codes may be printed on small stickers, tags, or bands that are affixed to produce, or may be printed on signs. Since 2006, stickers with PLU codes may also have a GS1 DataBar Stacked Omnidirectional barcode.

== Numbering conventions ==
Conventional produce is randomly assigned four-digit PLU codes in the 3000 and 4000 series. Organic produce may be designated by prefixing the four-digit conventional PLU with a 9.

Numbers 83000-84999 were supposed to be used for GMO productions, but they were opened for general use after GMO growers declined to use them.

=== Retailer-assigned codes ===
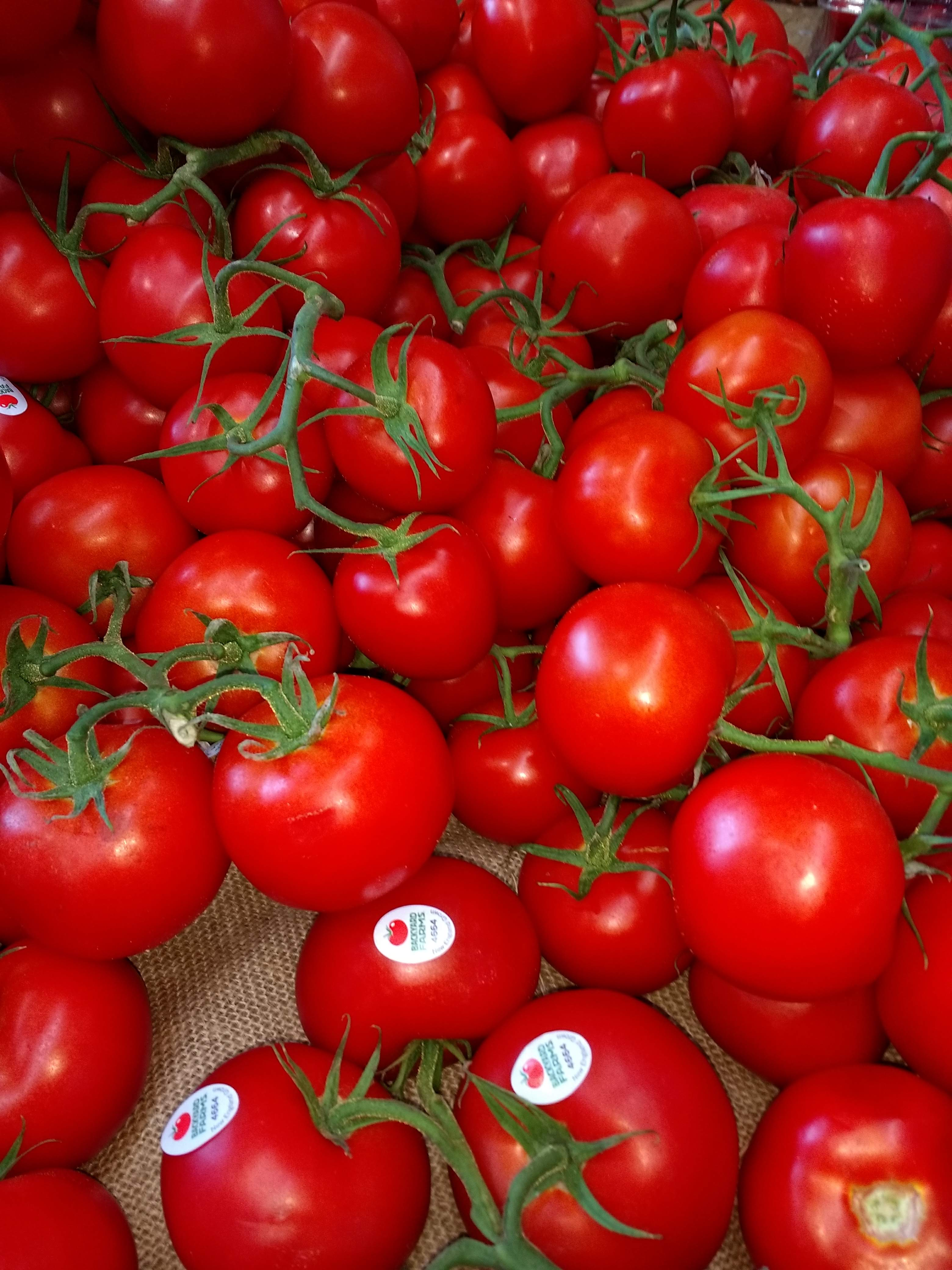
Red tomatoes on the vine with PLU code 4664 stickers in a supermarket

Some PLU code ranges are reserved for retailers. This allows codes to be defined by individual retailers or location, and allows the use of PLU codes in lieu of barcodes. There are retailer-assigned ranges for general and category-specific use. For example, 3170–3269 can be assigned by retailers to any goods, while 4193–4217 can only be assigned to apples.

Suppliers may coordinate with their retailers to use the same code in the retailer-assigned range for a specific product.

== Promotion via PLU stickers ==
Some producers have obtained a license to place characters on stickers on PLU code labels, often as a promotion for a movie, television show or other media franchise. For example, Imagination Farms has marketed produce with collectible Disney character stickers such as Toy Story and Finding Nemo under the Disney Garden brand, and Chiquita has marketed bananas with Minions stickers on them, along with a competition.

== Collecting ==
Although the collecting of PLU labels as a hobby already existed for a while, it became widespread through social media presence and fashion designs that use fruit stickers. The popularity of the hobby was further increased by online catalogs and collector clubs.

In addition to illustrations, important factors for collectors are compositions of these stickers and the type of product they are used on. Most popular materials for creating PLU code stickers are plastic film and paper, however cardboard, metallized film, wrapping tissue, and textiles are also known to be used.

== Environmental concerns ==
Although PLU labels are recognized globally and most chain supermarkets use them, they sometimes cause rejection of the fruits and vegetables to which they are attached from being accepted for composting disposal or disposal by cruise ships at sea. Generally, they are not made of biodegradable material.

== See also ==
- International Article Number
- Packaging
- Stock keeping unit (SKU) codes, another system
- Universal Product Code, another system for identification of consumer products
