= Delegated administration =

In computing, delegated administration or delegation of control describes the decentralization of role-based-access-control systems. Many enterprises use a centralized model of access control. For large organizations, this model scales poorly and IT teams become burdened with menial role-change requests. These requests — often used when hire, fire, and role-change events occur in an organization — can incur high latency times or suffer from weak security practices.

Such delegation involves assigning a person or group specific administrative permissions for an Organizational Unit. In information management, this is used to create teams that can perform specific (limited) tasks for changing information within a user directory or database. The goal of delegation is to create groups with minimum permissions that grant the ability to carry out authorized tasks. Granting extraneous/superfluous permissions would create abilities beyond the authorized scope of work.

One best practice for enterprise role management entails the use of LDAP groups. Delegated administration refers to a decentralized model of role or group management. In this model, the application or process owner creates, manages and delegates the management of roles. A centralized IT team simply operates the service of directory, metadirectory, web interface for administration, and related components.

Allowing the application or business process owner to create, manage and delegate groups supports a much more scalable approach to the administration of access rights.

In a metadirectory environment, these roles or groups could also be "pushed" or synchronized with other platforms. For example, groups can be synchronized with native operating systems such as Microsoft Windows for use on an access control list that protects a folder or file. With the metadirectory distributing groups, the central directory is the central repository of groups.

Some enterprise applications (e.g., PeopleSoft) support LDAP groups inherently. These applications are capable of using LDAP to call the directory for its authorization activities.

Web-based group management tools — used for delegated administration — therefore provide the following capabilities using a directory as the group repository:

- Decentralized management of groups (roles) and access rights by business- or process-owners
- Categorizing or segmenting users by characteristic, not by enumeration
- Grouping users for e-mail, subscription, and access control
- Reducing work process around maintenance of groups
- Reproducing groups on multiple platforms and into disparate environments

== Active Directory ==
In Microsoft Active Directory the administrative permissions this is accomplished using the Delegation of Control Wizard. Types of permissions include managing and viewing user accounts, managing groups, managing group policy links, generating Resultant Set of Policy, and managing and viewing InOrgPerson accounts.

A use of Delegation of Control could be to give managers complete control of users in their own department. With this arrangement managers can create new users, groups, and computer objects, but only in their own OU.

== See also ==
- Access control
- Identity management
- User provisioning
- RBAC

== Reading list ==
- Delegating Authority in Active Directory, TechNet Magazine
- Built-in Groups vs. Delegation, WindowsSecurity.Com
