= Tracking number =

Numbers associated with shipping packages

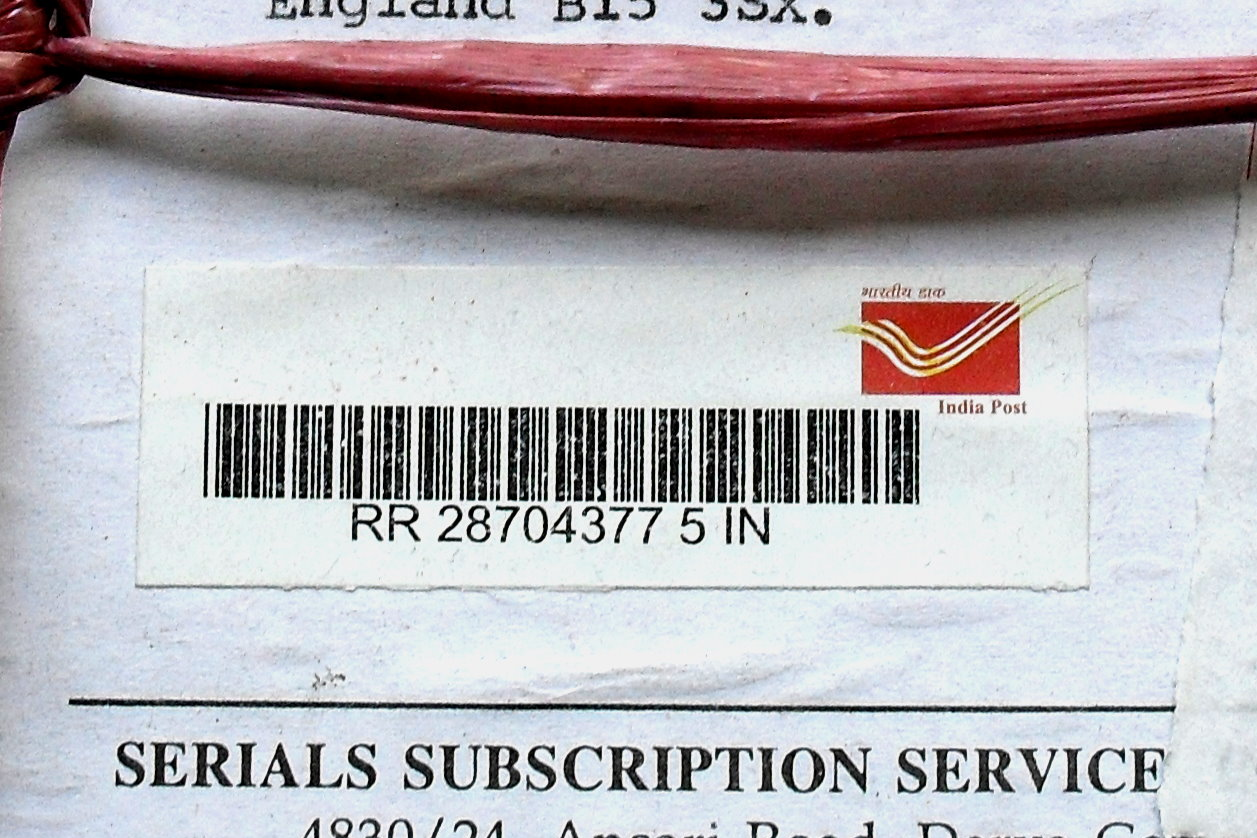
A parcel tracking number

Tracking numbers are numbers assigned to packages when they are shipped. Tracking numbers are useful for knowing the location of time sensitive deliveries. It is a unique ID number or code assigned to a package or parcel. The tracking number is typically printed on the shipping label as a bar code that can be scanned by anyone with a bar code reader or smartphone.

In the United States, some of the carriers using tracking numbers include UPS, FedEx, and the United States Postal Service. Most postal services use the S10 (UPU standard) (format AA 00000000 9 BB) for international mailings, including the United States Postal Service and most European postal services.

== Formats ==
Tracking numbers consist of letters and numbers typically between 8 and 40 characters long sometimes with spaces or hyphens between groupings of characters. When shown on a receipt after shipping a package the tracking number is usually close to the barcode.

=== For Companies Based in the United States of America (USA) ===
FedEx Ground and Express tracking numbers are 12 digits (with the ability to expand to 14 characters in the future), while overall barcode length is 34 digits.

A UPS tracking number, for domestic packages within the United States, will usually start with "1Z" followed by a 6 character shipper number (numbers and letters), a 2 digit service level indicator, and finally 8 digits identifying the package (the last digit being a check digit), for a total of 18 characters.

DHL Express supports the carrier-independent standard ISO 15459-1 for the identification of single packages. Such identifiers consist of uppercase characters and numerals, and they can be up to 35 digits long. Companies that already use this standard do not require an additional identifier to track their pieces when shipping with DHL Express. In addition, DHL Express uses numeric identifiers of exactly ten digits to track transport orders (i.e. an order to transport a shipment consisting of one or more pieces from A to B). Customers can use both codes for tracking purposes.

== See also ==
- Air waybill number (AWB number)
- FedEx
- S10 (UPU standard)
- United Parcel Service
- United States Postal Service
