= Global Data Synchronization Network =

Network of data pools

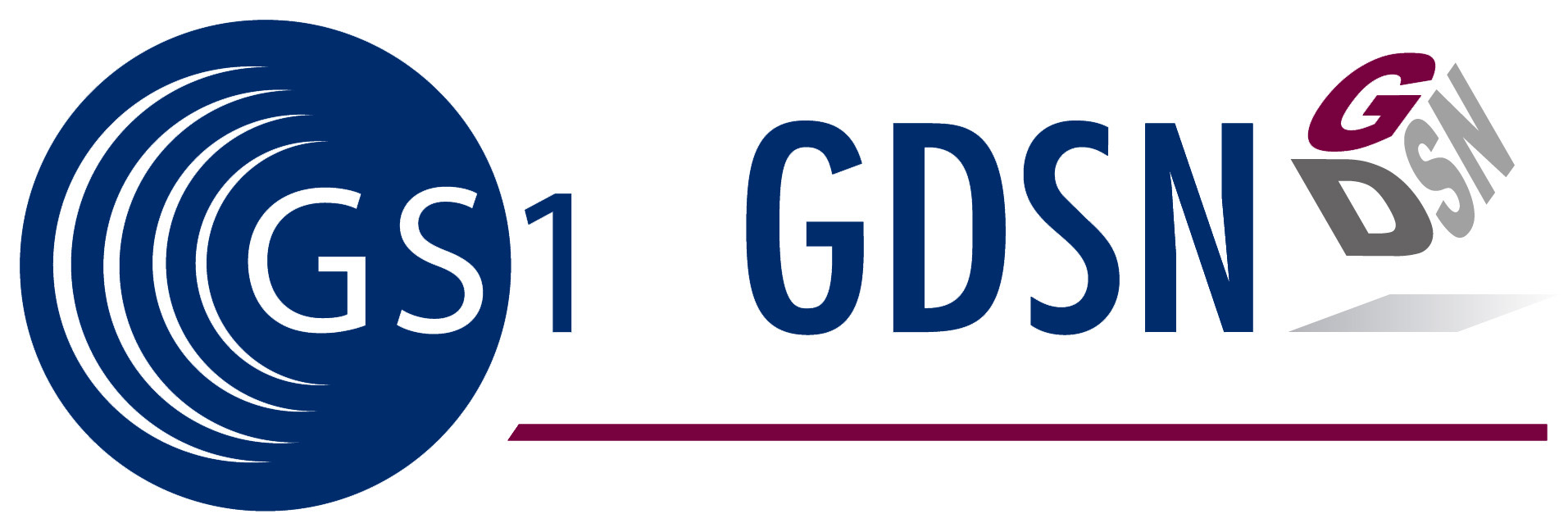
GDSN logo.

The Global Data Synchronization Network (GDSN) is an internet-based, interconnected network of interoperable data pools governed by GS1 standards. The GDSN enables companies around the globe to exchange standardized product master data with their trading partners.

The GDSN is used as a tool to support high data quality through use of authoritative data sources, real-time data synchronization, and standardization of data formatting.

The GDSN operates using a publish-subscribe pattern between two trading partners, each of which are registered with and access the GDSN via a data pool. The GS1 Global Registry acts as a directory to point to the data pool where data is housed, and matches subscription to registrations in order to facilitate synchronization.

Drummond Group, LLC is GS1's official GDSN testing and certification agency.

== Global identification numbers ==
The Global Location Number (GLN) and the Global Trade Item Number (GTIN) are the global identification numbers in the GDSN. The GLN is the identifier for legal entities, trading partners and locations while the GTIN is the identifier for trade items.

== Data pools ==
There are currently 44 GDSN-certified data pools. All data pools offer GDSN storage and synchronization, but they differ by additional information managed, supportive services, and pricing models.
