= IBM Information Management Software =

IBM software brand

Information Management Software is one of the brands within IBM Software Group (SWG) division. The major Information Management products include:

- IBM Db2 — management system (RDBMS)
- Informix Dynamic Server — high-throughput database server for online transaction processing (OLTP)
- Cloudscape — embedded RDBMS for Java
- Information Management System (IMS) — hierarchical database and information management system
- OmniFind — search and text analytics software
- Enterprise Content Management — IBM services for managing content, optimizing business processes and enabling compliance
- pureQuery - data access platform
- IBM RFID Information Center (RFIDIC) - Tracking and tracing products through global supply chains
- IBM InfoSphere DataStage - an ETL tool
- InfoSphere Guardium – Real-time database security and monitoring application to safeguard enterprise data (SAP, PeopleSoft, etc.) and address regulatory compliance requirements
