= AirRoad =

Australian logistics company

- Industry: Logistics
- Founded: 1989
- Founder: Tim Paine
- Headquarters: Sydney, Australia
- Website: www.airroad.com.au

AirRoad is a major national logistics company headquartered in Sydney, Australia, with operations in major capital and regional cities and towns around Australia. AirRoad was the first Australian transport carrier to introduce barcode scanning at an item level to track client's freight in 1990.

== History ==
AirRoad was established in 1989 by Tim Paine, who opened the first AirRoad depot in Sydney. In 1994 an AirRoad depot was set up in Melbourne, followed by Brisbane in 1997, and Perth in 1999. The latest addition is AirRoad Adelaide which was established in 2005.

AirRoad was the first Australian transport carrier to introduce item level barcode scanning to track client's freight in 1990. Each consignment item carried a barcode address label which is scanned at all major transit points throughout the AirRoad network producing an audit trail of every item. This allowed consignment tracking and proof of delivery imagery to be made available to clients on demand via an internet portal.

This was the advent of ‘Track and Trace’ functionality for transport and courier industry in Australia. As in other markets such as North America, this technology became industry standard because of client demand.

Plans are underway to address minimising the carbon footprint, improving trailer technology, and integration of hydrogen fuel generation for better fuel efficiency.

== Timeline ==
- 1989 - First parcel delivered
- 1990 - Item level Bar Code Scanning introduced
- 1994 - Specialised transport services were introduced
- 1995 - Logistics support was set up
- 2003 - AirRoad Direct (Division) established for internet access
- 2005 - AirRoad Specialised (Division) for sensitive freight transport business
- 2006 - Acquired Specialised Freight Services Pty Limited
- 2007 - Acquired Queensland Division of Send Australia
