= Physical markup language =

Physical markup language (PML) is a markup language based on XML for communicating a description of physical environments and the objects within them, their relationships to you, each other and the space. Within a location, the devices (RFID tags) controlled by the PML language act as parts of a browser. Together they render the experience. Each device contains a component that interprets the PML related to the device’s capabilities.

The physical markup language (PML) is proposed as a general, standard means for describing physical objects and environments for industrial, commercial and consumer applications. Given the broad scope of this vision, PML is crafted to allow modularity and flexibility.

The objective of PML is a simple, general language for describing physical objects for use in monitoring and control of a physical environment – particularly through the Internet. Applications include inventory tracking, automatic transaction, supply chain management, machine control and object-to-object communication.

See the definition of PML in MIT.EDU
