= GS1 DataBar Coupon =

GS1 Databar Coupon barcode sample

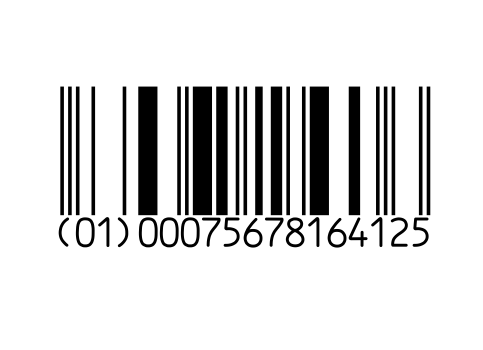
GS1 DataBar barcode symbol encoding a GTIN-12 number

GS1 DataBar Stacked Omni-Directional barcode symbol encoding 00123456789012

The GS1 Databar Coupon code has been in use in retail industry since the mid-1980s. At first, it was a UPC with system ID 5. Since UPCs cannot hold more than 12 digits, it required another barcode to hold additional information like offer code, expiration date and household ID numbers. Therefore, the code was often extended with an additional UCC/EAN 128 barcode. EAN 13 was sometimes used instead of UPC, and because it starts with 99, it was called the EAN 99 coupon barcode, and subsequently GS1 DataBar. After more than 20 years in use, there is now a need to encode more data for complex coupons, and to accommodate longer company IDs, so the traditional coupon code has become less efficient and sometimes not usable at all.

== Features ==
Formerly known as Reduced Space Symbology (RSS-14), this family of barcodes includes:

- Symbols intended for retail point of sale scanning:
  - GS1 DataBar Omnidirectional
  - GS1 DataBar Stacked Omnidirectional
  - GS1 DataBar Expanded
  - GS1 DataBar Expanded Stacked
- Symbols that are not intended for retail Point-of-Sale scanning:
  - GS1 DataBar Truncated
  - GS1 DataBar Limited
  - GS1 DataBar Stacked

All GS1 DataBar barcodes encode a GTIN-12 or GTIN-13 in a 14-digit data structure. In order to make the GTIN-12 or GTIN-13 a 14-digit data structure, a leading zero or zeros is filled to the left of the GTIN. GS1 DataBar Omnidirectional, GS1 DataBar Stacked Omnidirectional, GS1 DataBar Expanded, and GS1 DataBar Expanded Stacked have omnidirectional scanning capability. GS1 DataBar Truncated, GS1 DataBar Stacked and GS1 DataBar Limited can only be scanned by a linear hand held or imaging scanning device: they cannot be scanned by omnidirectional scanners and are intended to be read by handheld scanners.

GS1 DataBar Stacked Omnidirectional is designed to condense the GTIN information into a more compact and square barcode suitable for use on smaller packages (such as the label stickers on fresh produce).

GS1 DataBar Limited, GS1 DataBar Stacked and GS1 DataBar Truncated are designed for very small item identification and are mainly used in the healthcare industry. Each encodes a GTIN-12 or GTIN-13 in 14-digit data structure. Only GS1 DataBar Limited uses an indicator digit 1.

In addition to encoding Application Identifier (01) GTIN, GS1 DataBar Expanded and GS1 DataBar Expanded Stacked can encode additional GS1 Application Identifiers such as sell-by date, weight, and lot number. Each symbol has a capacity of up to 74 characters. These attributes can help in controlling shrinkage, optimizing product replenishment, and improving the traceability of a product at the point of sale. They are seeing increased use in manufacturers' coupons. Starting June 2011, GS1 Databar use is mandated for coupons and the use of UPC-A must be discontinued.

== Common usage ==
In the United States, GS1 DataBar Coupon barcodes are often placed on grocery coupons issued by product manufacturers (so-called Manufacturer Coupons). These grocery coupons are typically used to advertise products by offering discounts to the consumer at the time of purchase. For example, a coupon may offer a $1.00 discount when the consumer purchases a specific brand and flavor of toothpaste.

During the early years of its use, many checkout registers systems could not read GS1 DataBar barcodes. Consequently, coupons would have both a GS1 DataBar coupon and a traditional UPC/EAN barcode coupon for older registers. Stores have upgraded their checkout systems, so now most coupons have only GS1 DataBar barcodes.

== Issues with old coupon code ==
Because the size of the traditional UPC/EAN barcode is limited, a great deal of additional information often had to be entered manually at the time of purchase, and complex offers such as "buy a shampoo and conditioner, and get a hair gel free" were impossible to encode. The manual entry process generally delayed the purchase transaction and introduced errors, inconveniencing customers and raising costs for retailers. In addition, because GS1 has started assigning Company Prefixes that are more than 6 digits long, but UPC/EAN barcodes can only accommodate 6-digit prefixes, companies with prefixes longer than 6 digits cannot use the old system at all.

In order to address these problems, GS1 came up with a new solution for coupon barcodes. Instead of using a UPC barcode with an Extended UCC/EAN part, it decided to use a single GS1 DataBar Expanded Stacked (formerly RSS Expanded Stacked) barcode. This barcode can hold up to 74 numeric digits or 41 alphanumeric characters, and can be encoded with multiple coupon-specific Application Identifiers such as expiration date, serial number, etc.

== New DataBar Coupon timeline ==
GS1 laid out specific instructions detailing how to compose coupon data using the DataBar Expanded Stacked barcode symbology. The new standard was rolled out in two phases: first there was an interim phase where the UPC remained along with the expanded barcode for backward compatibility. This interim process started in 2007. By 2011, the final phase with stand alone Expanded Stacked barcodes went into effect, and as of June 30, 2015 the GS1 DataBar is the USA industry standard for coupons.

== Human readable ==
Having coupon barcodes in a human-readable format is important when the barcode does not scan and manual entry is required. The GS1 Company Prefix and offer code, separated by a dash, are shown as the human-readable interpretation of the barcode.
