= GS1 =

Organization for barcode standards

- Type: Not-for-profit organisation
- Industry: Standards
- Founded: 26 April 1974; 52 years ago
- Headquarters: Brussels, Belgium
- Number of locations: 116 offices worldwide
- Key people: Renaud de Barbuat (CEO)
- Revenue: 30,662,000 euro (2021)
- Website: www.gs1.org

GS1 is a global coordinating office leading a collection of neutral not-for-profit organizations which together develop and maintain standards for barcodes and other supply chain technologies. The best known of these standards is the UPC/EAN barcode, a symbol printed on products that can be scanned electronically.

GS1 has 120 local member organizations covering 150 countries, and over 2 million user companies. (Note: GS1 UK, for example, is a member organization in the UK, with its own company members. GS1 UK GS1 is a company limited by guarantee based in London.) Its main office is in Brussels, in Avenue Louise.

== History ==
In 1969, the retail industry in the United States was searching for a way to speed up the check-out process in shops. The Ad Hoc Committee for a Uniform Grocery Product Identification Code was established to find a solution.

In 1973, the Universal Product Code (UPC) was selected by this group as the first single standard for unique product identification. In 1974, the Uniform Code Council (UCC) was founded to administer the standard. On 26 June 1974, a pack of Wrigley's chewing gum became the first ever product with a barcode to be scanned in a shop.

In 1976, the original 12-digit code was expanded to 13 digits, which allowed the identification system to be used outside the U.S. In 1977, the European Article Numbering Association (EAN) was established in Brussels, with founding members from 12 countries.

In 1990, EAN and UCC signed a global cooperation agreement and expanded their overall presence to 45 countries. In 1999, EAN and UCC launched the Auto-ID Centre to develop Electronic Product Code (EPC), enabling GS1 standards to be used for RFID.

In 2004, EAN and UCC launched the Global Data Synchronization Network (GDSN), a global, internet-based initiative that enables trading partners to efficiently exchange product master data.

By 2005, the organisation was present in over 90 countries, and it started to use the name GS1 on a worldwide basis. Whilst "GS1" is not an acronym, it refers to the organisation offering one global system of standards.

In August 2018, the GS1 Web URI Structure Standard was ratified, allowing unique ID's to be added to products by storing a URI (a webpage-like address) as a QR code.

== Barcodes ==
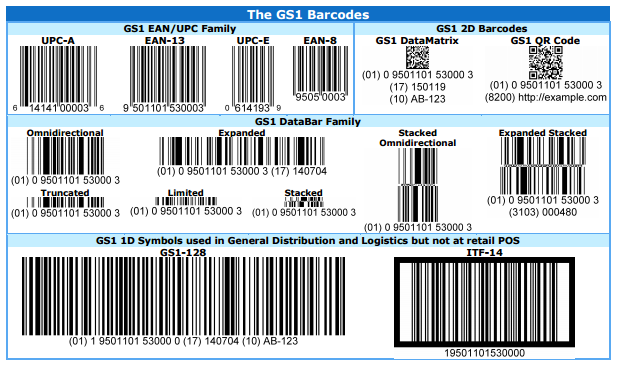
The GS1 barcodes

Barcodes defined by GS1 standards are very common. GS1 introduced the barcode in 1974. A barcode encodes a product identification number that can be scanned electronically, making it easier for products to be tracked, processed, and stored.

Barcodes improve the efficiency, safety, speed and visibility of supply chains across physical and digital channels. They have a crucial role in the retail industry, including today's online marketplaces, moving beyond just faster checkout to improved inventory and delivery management, and the opportunity to sell online on a global scale. In the UK alone, the introduction of the barcode in the retail industry has resulted in savings of 10.5 billion pounds per year.

Some of the barcodes that GS1 developed and manages are: EAN/UPC (used mainly on consumer goods), GS1 Data Matrix (used mainly on healthcare products), GS1-128, GS1 DataBar, and GS1 QR Code. Notably, GS1 barcodes can hold more than just a single numerical identifiers, as GS1 has defined a modular and arbitrarily combinable semantic encoding of defined data within GS1 barcodes through the publication of over 150 "Application Identifiers" (AI). These AIs allow encoding of details such as the GTIN – AI:(01), the "Country of Origin" – AI:(422), and the "Expiration date" – AI:(17), amongst many other possibilities, including URLs – AI:(8200).

== Sunrise 2027 ==
In 2022, GS1 launched a global initiative known as Sunrise 2027 to facilitate the transition from one-dimensional (1D) barcodes, such as the EAN/UPC, to two-dimensional (2D) barcodes at retail point-of-sale (POS) and point-of-care (POC) systems. The program sets a global target date of 2027 for retailers and healthcare providers to ensure their scanning systems can read both traditional linear barcodes and new 2D symbols, such as QR codes and GS1 DataMatrix.

Two-dimensional barcodes allow a single standardized symbol to carry more information than legacy formats, enabling functions such as enhanced traceability, product authentication, inventory management, sustainability reporting, and consumer engagement through the GS1 Digital Link standard. Pilot programs and retail tests are already underway in over 48 countries, representing approximately 88 percent of global GDP.

== Standards ==
The most influential GS1 standard is the Global Trade Item Number (GTIN). It identifies products uniquely around the world and forms the base of the GS1 system. Other GS1 standards include the following:

- Application Level Events (ALE)
- Core Business Vocabulary (CBV)
- EAN/UPC barcodes
- EPC/RFID tags
- EPCIS
- GEPIR
- Global Data Model
- Global Data Synchronization Network (GDSN)
- Global Document Type Identifier (GDTI)
- Global Individual Asset Identifier (GIAI)
- Global Identification Number for Consignment (GINC)
- Global Location Number (GLN)
- Global Product Classification (GPC)
- Global Model Number (GMN)
- Global Returnable Asset Identifier (GRAI)
- Global Service Relationship Number (GSRN)
- Global Shipment Identification Number (GSIN)
- GS1-128
- GS1 DataBar
- GS1 DataMatrix
- GS1 Digital Link
- GS1 EDI
- ITF-14
- Low-Level Reader Protocol (LLRP)
- Object Name Service (ONS)
- Serial Shipping Container Code (SSCC)

Many GS1 standards are also ISO standards, including the GTIN, GLN, and SSCC.

GS1 also acts as the secretariat for ISO's Automatic identification and data capture techniques technical committee (ISO/IEC JTC 1/SC 31).

GS1 standards are developed and maintained through the GS1 Global Standards Management Process (GSMP), a community-based forum that brings together representatives from different industries and businesses.

== Industries ==
=== Retail and marketplaces ===
Retail was the first industry that GS1 began working with and has remained their primary focus. Today, GS1 operates in four retail sub-sectors on a global level: Apparel, Fresh Foods, CPG and General Merchandise.

Key focus areas in retail include sustainability, data quality, compliance with regulatory requirements, traceability of products from their origin through delivery, and upstream integration between manufacturers and suppliers.

As consumers are recurring to e-commerce more often throughout the years, GS1 has developed standards that uniquely identify products for the benefit of consumers and for search engines, providing accurate and complete product information digitally.

Major e-commerce companies such as eBay, Amazon and Google Shopping require companies to use a GS1 GTIN to sell on their websites.

=== Healthcare ===
Since 2005, GS1 has operated in Healthcare with the primary objective to enhance patient safety, and to drive supply chain efficiencies.

More than 70 countries have healthcare-related regulations or trading partner requirements where GS1 standards are being used for the above reasons as well for medicines as medical devices. Members of GS1 Healthcare include more than 140 leading healthcare organisations worldwide.

=== Other industries ===
GS1 operates three other key industries globally: Transport & Logistics, Food service and Technical Industries. GS1's 120 Member Organisations in 150 countries around the world collectively focus on dozens of industry sectors.

== See also ==
- List of GS1 country codes
