= Advance ship notice =

Electronic notification for logistics

An advance ship notice or advance shipping notice (ASN) is a notification of pending and upcoming deliveries matched to a previously-provided packing list. It is usually sent in an electronic format and is a common EDI document. The ASN can be used to list the contents of a shipment of goods as well as additional information relating to the shipment, such as order information, product description, physical characteristics, type of packaging, markings, carrier information, and configuration of goods within the transportation equipment. The ASN enables the sender to describe the contents and configuration of a shipment to various levels of detail and provides an ordered flexibility to convey information.

== Terminology ==
In the EDI X12 system, an ASN is known as an EDI 856 document. The EDIFACT equivalent is the DESADV (Dispatch Advice) message.

== Purpose ==
The ASN is noteworthy in the way that it is a new concept in logistics, enabled by the advance of modern communication methods. Although it provides information similar to the Bill of lading, its function is very different. While a bill of lading is intended to accompany a load on its path, the role of an ASN is to provide information to the destination's receiving operations well in advance of the delivery. This tends to impact on the logistics stream in three areas: cost, accuracy, and flexibility.

Cost: modern receiving operations rarely have time to break down a shipping unit (carton or pallet) and identify its components, depending instead on quick scans of barcodes on shipping labels. An ASN can provide a list of all of the barcoded ID numbers of the shipping units and the contents of each. Receiving costs are thought to be reduced by about 40%.

Accuracy: upon receipt of the ASN, the receiver is immediately informed of any difference between what was expected, and what has actually been shipped.

Flexibility: knowing the actual fill rates of the orders gives the receiver the opportunity to re-allocate goods in subsequent shipments.

The ASN can be used to pay suppliers directly for goods received. This can be accomplished by receiving the ASN into the company’s enterprise resource planning (ERP) software, printing company labels for each container received, affixing the labels on the containers, and then transmitting any discrepancies to the supplier via EDI.

In business-to-consumer transactions, consumers receive ACNs confirming shipping and expected delivery.

After receiving an ACN or EDI 856, a buyer responds with an EDI 997 Functional Acknowledgement.
