= Serial shipping container code =

Identifier number for logistics

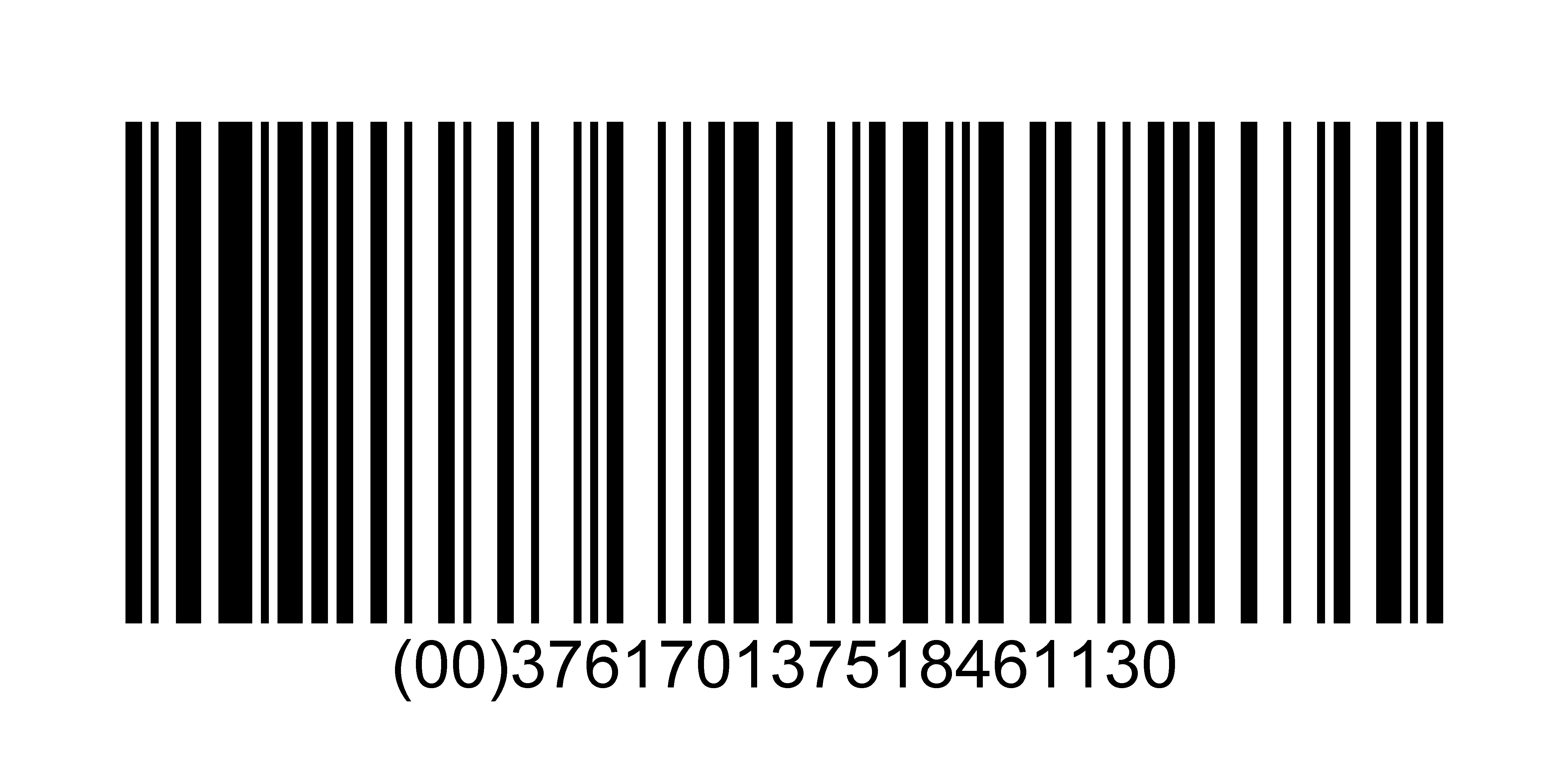
NVE / SSCC shown in GS1- 151 barcode

The Serial Shipping Container Code (SSCC) is an 18-digit number used to identify logistics units. In order to automate the reading process, the SSCC is often encoded in a barcode, generally GS1-128, and can also be encoded in an RFID tag. It is used in electronic commerce transactions.

The SSCC comprises an extension digit, a GS1 company prefix, a serial reference, and a check digit. It is all numeric. It is applicable to the tertiary level of packing.

The SSCC is commonly used in the advance ship notice (ASN) EDI transaction.

The SSCC should not be confused with the GRAI or GIAI code of the (serialized) objects within the SSCC object: the SSCC is created in general during packing at a certain party (shipping party) and loses its value after receipt by or after unpacking by another party (the receiving party). The serialized objects within the SSCC container can always be identified by their GRAI or GIAI identifier, unless that GRAI or GIAI code is no longer valid, either because the serialized object itself is destroyed or its identifier is no longer valid.
