= EPCIS =

Global GS1 standard

Electronic Product Code Information Services (EPCIS) is a global GS1 Standard for creating and sharing visibility event data, both within and across enterprises, to enable users to gain a shared view of physical or digital objects within a relevant business context. "Objects" in the context of EPCIS typically refers to physical objects that are handled in physical steps of an overall business process involving one or more organizations. Examples of such physical objects include trade items (products), logistic units, returnable assets, fixed assets, physical documents, etc. “Objects” may also refer to digital objects which participate in comparable business process steps. Examples of such digital objects include digital trade items (music downloads, electronic books, etc.), digital documents (electronic coupons, etc.), and so forth.

The EPCIS standard was originally conceived as part of a broader effort to enhance collaboration between trading partners by sharing of detailed information about physical or digital objects. The name EPCIS reflects the origins of this effort in the development of the Electronic Product Code (EPC). However, EPCIS does not require the use of Electronic Product Codes, nor of Radio-frequency identification (RFID) data carriers, and as of EPCIS 1.1 does not even require instance-level identification (for which the Electronic Product Code was originally designed). The EPCIS standard applies to all situations in which visibility event data is to be captured and shared, and the presence of “EPC” within the name is of historical significance only.

EPCIS 1.0 was first ratified in April 2007. At the time of ratification, over 30 companies had used the draft EPCIS standard to exchange data and collaborate with trading partners As of 2014, 24 commercial products had received certificates of compliance to the EPCIS standard from GS1. EPCIS 1.1 was ratified by GS1 in May, 2014. EPCIS 1.2 was ratified by GS1 (in conjunction with CBV 1.2) in September 2016. EPCIS 2.0 and CBV 2.0 were ratified by GS1 in June 2022. EPCIS 2.1 is currently in progress and planned to be published at the end of 2026.

== History ==
In 2001, the MIT Auto-ID Center published a paper proposing the Physical markup language (PML), intended as "a common 'language' for describing physical objects, processes and environments". PML was one of four components of an "intelligent infrastructure" envisioned by the Auto-ID Center, the other three components being RFID tags, the Electronic Product Code, and the Object Naming Service. As the work of the MIT Auto-ID Center was taken up by EPCglobal in 2004, the PML concept was renamed Electronic Product Code Information Services (EPCIS), and efforts began to create a global standard. In 2005, the first version of the EPCglobal Architecture Framework was published, which introduced EPCIS as a standard under development and showed how it related to other components of an envisioned architecture for RFID-based tracking of physical objects within supply chains.

EPCIS 1.0 was first ratified in April 2007. A companion standard, the EPC Core Business Vocabulary 1.0, was ratified by EPCglobal in October, 2010. Despite the RFID-oriented origins of EPCIS, it came to be used in applications that used bar codes exclusively or bar codes in combination with RFID tags.

EPCIS 1.1 and CBV 1.1 were ratified in May 2014. New features in EPCIS 1.1 include support for class-level identification (needed especially in bar code applications), a new event type to describe processes where inputs are transformed into outputs, and additional event data to describe business transfers and instance- or lot-level master data.

EPCIS 1.2 and CBV 1.2 were ratified in September 2016. New features include a mechanism to declare a previous event as being erroneous, and a mechanism for including master data into the EPCIS document header.
