= Global Location Number =

Part of the GS1 systems of standards

The Global Location Number (GLN) is part of the GS1 systems of standards. It is a simple tool used to identify a location and can identify locations uniquely where required. This identifier is compliant with norm ISO/IEC 6523.

The GS1 Identification Key is used to identify physical locations or legal entities. The key comprises a GS1 Company Prefix, Location Reference, and Check Digit.

Location identified with GLN could be a physical location such as a warehouse or a legal entity such as a company or customer or a function that takes place within a legal entity. It can also be used to identify something as specific as a particular shelf in a store. Being able to identify locations with a unique number is a key to many business processes. The GLN is used in electronic messaging between customers and suppliers, where location advice is important. GLN is also used within companies to identify specific locations both electronically in a database and physically where the GLN can be produced in a bar code or GS1 EPC tag.

== GLN structure ==
GLN is a 13-digit number structured as follows:

Global Location Number Structure
GS1 Company Prefix (var. length)	Location Reference	Check Digit
N1 N2 N3 N4 N5 N6 N7 N8 N9 N10 N11 N12		N13

=== GS1 Check digit ===
GLNs use the standard GS1 Check Digit as the default for all GS1 identifiers unless another check digit method is specified. Per the official GS1 General Specification the check digit is a 'modulo 10 check digit' or Luhn algorithm check digit. GS1 also provides a check digit calculator. as well as a page explaining how to manually perform the calculation.

=== Similarities and differences to other GS1 identifiers ===
Both the GLN and International Article Number also known as European Article Number or EAN share a common structure made of a 12-digit GS1 Company Prefix and Unique identifier followed by a 1-digit GS1 Check Digit. This means an IAN/EAN and a GLN can overlap in the identifiers used. This is why in most B2B standards like ASC X12 and EDIFACT the GTIN-13, formerly EAN will appear in line item elements like the LIN (line item), PO1 (PO line), or IT1 (Invoice Line) segments in X12 or LIN (line item) in segment in EDIFACT. While the GLN will appear in then N1 (Party Identifier) segment in X12 or then NAD (Name and Address) segment in EDIFACT. This distinct identification should be used in all Business-to-Business standards the integrate and use GS1 identifiers for any combination of GS1 identifier types.

== See also ==
- Global Trade Item Number
