= Registro Nacional Migratório =

Identification registry for foreigners resident in Brazil

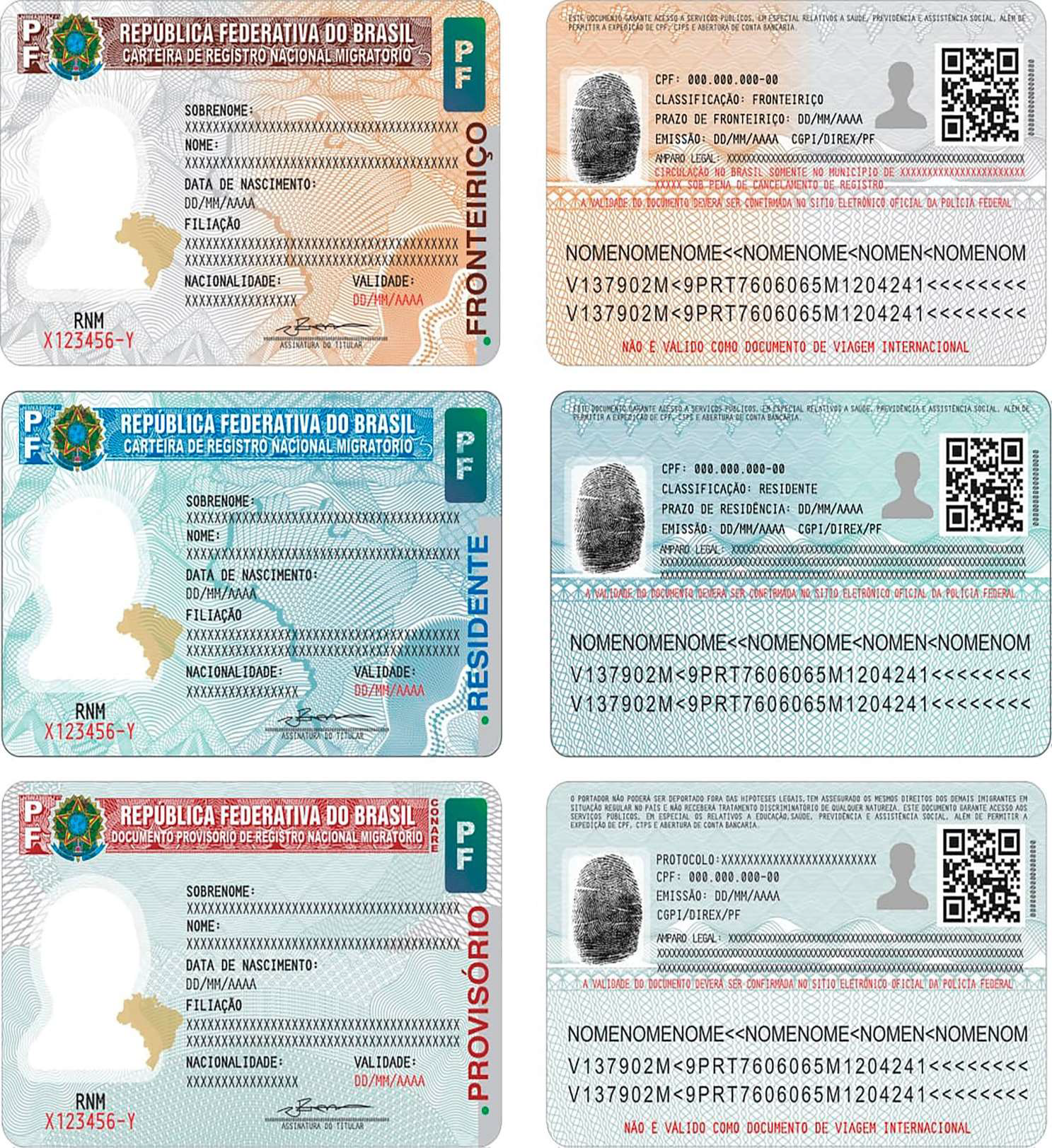
All versions for National Migratory Registry Card (CRNM, Carteira de Registro Nacional Migratório) issued by Regional Superintendences of Federal Police from Federative Units. It follows the bearer's photo, signature, right thumb fingerprint, name, date of birth, filiation, nationality, date of issue, date of expiry, Migratory National Registry Number and CPF Number.

The Registro Nacional de Estrangeiros (RNE, National Registry of Foreigners), known since 2018 as Registro Nacional Migratório (RNM, National Migratory Registry) due to the New Immigration Law (No. 13445) enacted on May 24, 2017, by Brazilian former ex-president Michel Temer, is, next to the Registro Diplomático (RD, Diplomatic Registry), the main identification registry provided by Brazil to foreign citizens in Brazilian territory. The Cédula de Identidade de Estrangeiro (CIE, Foreigner's Identity Card), known since 2018 as Carteira de Registro Nacional Migratório (CRNM, National Migratory Registry Card) was instituted as its result by Brazilian former ex-president Getúlio Vargas on May 4, 1938, through the Decree-Law No. 406. The New Immigration Law lists several cases in which foreign citizens in Brazilian territory can apply for their Migratory National Registry by faculty or by obligation (most of the cases involves immigration, work or residency for undefined time). Citizens with low income, such as applicants for the Provisional Document of Migratory National Registry (refugees, asylum seekers, unaccompanied minors, victims of human trafficking and human slavery in particularly vulnerable conditions), may apply for its fee exemption.

The RNM/CRNM is issued by Regional Superintendences of Federal Police from Federative Units. Applicants have to fill out a form and provide documentation including travel document, visa granted by a Brazilian Embassy and birth certificate (or marriage certificate, when married or divorced). Documents shall be translated by a sworn translator.

== History ==
The alien's ID was previously known as modelo 19, created in 1938 by former Brazilian president Getúlio Vargas during the Third Brazilian Republic. It was enacted by executive order law No. 406 on May 4, 1938. It required all foreigners under 60 years old to register and those under 60 were exempted from it. Records of those registrations are available at the Brazilian National Archives.

The police was responsible for registering the foreigners on ports of disembarkation and police stations.

Due to the Equality Statute between Brazil and Portugal, Portuguese nationals are issued a Brazilian identity card, citing their nationality and the statute.

Currently, Transgender cardholders are able to have their chosen name listed on the front of the card, however their deadname (name assigned at birth) is still listed on the back of the card.

== Physical appearance ==
The information contained on the current National Migratory Identity Card is given only in Portuguese.

The "Residente" (Resident) card is also valid as a travel document for MERCOSUR countries.

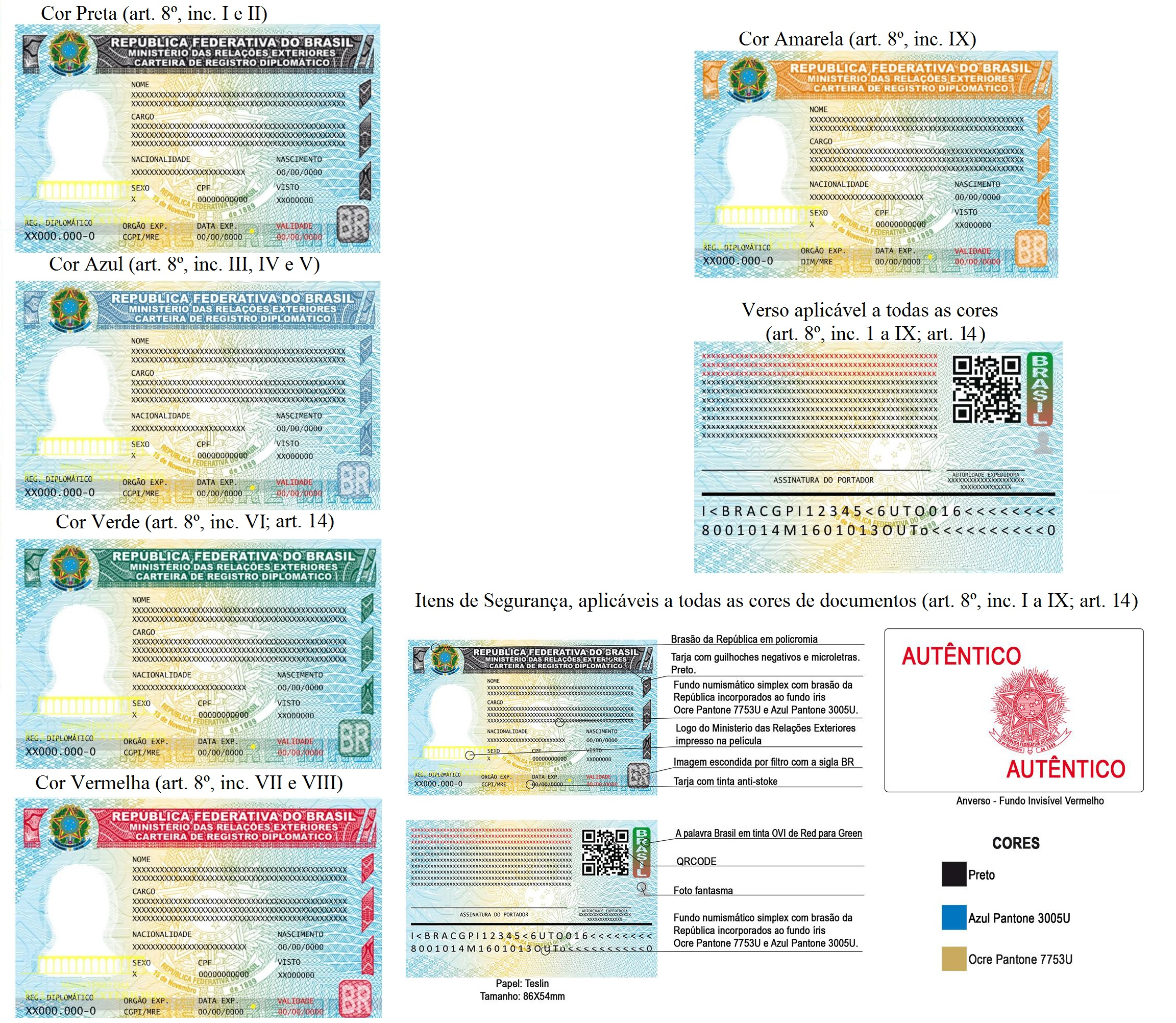
All versions for Diplomatic Registry Card, similar identification document issued by Ministry Of Foreign Affairs to diplomats and diplomatic representatives in Brazilian territory. Its owners also can apply for National Migratory Registry Card.

=== Front side ===
The front side shows the words "República Federativa Do Brasil" (Federal Republic Of Brazil) and "Carteira De Registro Nacional Migratório". It contains the following information:

- 3X4CM photo of the bearer;
- Migratory National Registry number (works as National Civil Identification);
- Classification type (provisional, borderer or resident);
- Surname of the bearer;
- Name of the bearer;
- Birth date (DD/MM/YYYY);
- Expiry date (DD/MM/YYYY);
- Filiation of the bearer;
- Nationality of the bearer;
- Expiry date (DD/MM/YYYY);
- Signature of the bearer (illiterate or stunted receive specific observation).

=== Rear side ===
It contains the following information:

- CPF number;
- Residency authorization deadline (DD/MM/YYYY);
- Issue date (DD/MM/YYYY);
- Card issuer (may come as CGPI/DIREX/PF or as SR/PF/UF);
- Right thumb fingerprint;
- Legal protection;
- Quick Responsive Code;
- Machine Readable Zone Code.

== See also ==
- Brazilian Identity Card
- Brazilian Passport
- CPF
