= Brazilian nationality law =

Constitution of the Federative Republic of Brazil Constituição da República Federativa do Brasil

National Congress of Brazil
- Territorial extent: Brazil
- Enacted by: 1988 Constituent Assembly
- Commenced: 5 October 1988
- Status: Amended

Brazilian nationality law details the conditions by which a person is a national of Brazil. The primary law governing nationality requirements is the 1988 Constitution of Brazil, which came into force on 5 October 1988.

With few exceptions, almost all individuals born in the country are automatically citizens at birth. Foreign nationals may naturalize after meeting a minimum residence period (usually four years), demonstrating proficiency in the Portuguese language, and fulfilling a good character requirement.

Brazil was previously a colony and constituent kingdom of the Portuguese Empire, and local residents were Portuguese subjects. Although Brazil gained independence in 1822 and Brazilian nationals no longer hold Portuguese nationality, they continue to have favoured status when living in Portugal; Brazilians resident for at least three years are eligible to vote in Portuguese elections and serve in public office there.

Brazil is a member state of Mercosur, and all Brazilian nationals are Mercosur citizens. They have facilitated access to residence rights in all member states and most associated states of Mercosur.

== At birth ==
Any person born in Brazil acquires Brazilian nationality at birth, with the sole exception of children of parents in the service of a foreign government, such as foreign diplomats.

A person born outside Brazil of a Brazilian parent also acquires Brazilian nationality at birth if:

- The Brazilian parent is in the service of the Brazilian government; or
- The person is registered with a Brazilian consular office; or
- The person later moves to Brazil and confirms one's nationality before a federal judge.

Between 1994 and 2007, registration with a Brazilian consular office did not confer Brazilian nationality. In September 2007, a constitutional amendment reinstituted consular registration as a means of acquiring Brazilian nationality.

== By naturalization ==
=== Requirements ===
Foreigners may apply for Brazilian nationality if they meet the following criteria:

- Legal competence, being over the age of majority (18 years, or 16 if emancipated);
- Four years of permanent residency in Brazil;
- Ability to communicate in Portuguese; and
- No prior criminal conviction, in Brazil or in the country of origin, unless rehabilitated.

The residency requirement may be reduced in certain circumstances:

- Only two years of residency are required for those who have provided "relevant services" to the country, for those with notable "professional, scientific or artistic ability", or for stateless people;
- Only one year of residency is required for those who have a Brazilian spouse or child (not including minors provisionally naturalized), or for those originating from Portuguese language countries;
- No residency period is required for those married to a Brazilian diplomat for more than five years, or for those who worked for more than 10 years in a Brazilian diplomatic mission.

The ability to communicate in Portuguese may be attested by one of various certificates, such as with the CELPE-Bras exam, completion of a Portuguese language course for immigrants in a Brazilian university, or completion of elementary, secondary or higher education in Brazil or in another Portuguese language country. Those who have lived in Brazil for more than 15 years or who are nationals of Portuguese language countries are not required to attest their Portuguese language ability.

Minors who moved to Brazil under 10 years of age may be granted a provisional naturalization, and within two years after reaching the age of majority they may request a permanent naturalization. At that time they must satisfy the requirement of no criminal conviction or of rehabilitation, but they are not required to attest their Portuguese language ability.

=== Process ===
The application for naturalization is filed online. There is no fee for the application itself, although there may be fees to obtain some of the required documents. The initial processing is done by the Federal Police, which collects the applicant's fingerprints and may request a recorded interview or additional documents. The process is then forwarded to the Ministry of Justice and Public Security, which may also request additional documents, and finally publishes its decision in the Official Journal, available online. If approved, a copy of this decision is sufficient proof of naturalization to obtain a Brazilian identity document or passport. There is no ceremony. Since 21 November 2017, certificates of naturalization are not automatically issued, but the citizen may request one if desired.

Since May 2016, Brazil does not require naturalized citizens to renounce their previous nationality.

== Dual nationality and loss of Brazilian nationality ==
Since October 2023, Brazil does not impose any restriction on dual nationality. Brazilian nationality may be lost only in the case of naturalized citizens whose naturalization is canceled by a court sentence due to fraud in their naturalization process or due to an act "against the constitutional order and the democratic state", or in the case of people who explicitly request the loss of their Brazilian nationality before a Brazilian authority as long as such loss would not make them stateless.

In its original text, the Brazilian constitution of 1988 stated that Brazilians who voluntarily naturalized in another country could lose Brazilian nationality. In 1994, a constitutional amendment modified this provision, stating that Brazilians who acquired another nationality could lose Brazilian nationality, except if the other nationality was acquired by origin (by birth or descent) or if naturalization was required by the other country for the person to remain residing there or to exercise civil rights. In practice, the Brazilian government only used this provision to revoke Brazilian nationality in very few cases, such as for the purpose of extradition, as the Brazilian constitution does not allow extradition of its own citizens by birth. In 2023, another constitutional amendment eliminated the possibility of loss of Brazilian nationality due to acquisition of another nationality.

People who requested the loss of their Brazilian nationality, or who lost it due to acquiring another nationality under the previous constitutional provision, may request the reacquisition of Brazilian nationality.

Since May 2016, Brazil does not require naturalized citizens to renounce their previous nationality.

Brazilians who also have another nationality are allowed to enter and leave Brazil with the passport of the other country, and may apply for a Brazilian visa on such passport if needed, including an electronic visa if applicable for such nationality. When entering Brazil, if they also present a Brazilian identity card, they are admitted as Brazilians, otherwise they are admitted as foreigners, subject to the regular limitations as such.

== Rights and obligations ==
=== Military service ===
Male Brazilian citizens have a 12-month military service obligation, unless the citizen has a disqualifying physical or psychological condition, or the citizen does not wish to serve and the military finds enough volunteers to support its needs. Therefore, although registering for the military is mandatory, about 95% of those who register receive an exemption. Male citizens between 18 and 45 years of age are required to present a military registration certificate when applying for a Brazilian passport.

=== Voting ===
Voting in Brazil is allowed for citizens over 16 years of age and mandatory for literate citizens between 18 and 70 years of age, except conscripts, who are not allowed to vote during their period of mandatory military service. Those who are required but do not vote in an election and do not present an acceptable justification, such as being away from their voting locality at the time, must pay a fine, normally R$3.51, but in some cases the fine may be waived, reduced, or increased up to R$35.13. Citizens between 18 and 70 years of age are required to present proof of voting compliance (by having voted, justified absence or paid the fine) when applying for a Brazilian passport.

=== Naturalized citizens ===
The constitution makes a few distinctions between Brazilian citizens by birth and by naturalization. Only citizens by birth may become President or Vice President of Brazil, President of the Chamber of Deputies, President of the Senate, members of the Supreme Federal Court, diplomats, officers of the Armed Forces, Minister of Defence, or certain members of the Council of the Republic. Naturalized citizens, but not citizens by birth, may be extradited (only for a common crime committed before naturalization or for drug trafficking committed before or after naturalization), and may lose Brazilian nationality if convicted of fraud in their naturalization process or of an act "against the constitutional order and the democratic state". The constitution also restricts the ownership and management of journalism and broadcasting companies to citizens by birth or who have been naturalized for more than 10 years. Other than the cases mentioned in the constitution, no law may make distinctions between citizens by birth and by naturalization.

Many naturalized citizens have been elected to public offices, including aldermen, mayors, state and federal deputies, and a state governor. Some naturalized citizens have also been appointed to the Superior Court of Justice and various ministries.

=== Portuguese citizens ===
Due to a treaty, citizens of Portugal permanently residing in Brazil may request equal civil rights, and after three years of residence also political rights, such as voting and being elected, as if they were naturalized citizens of Brazil. In this case, exercising political rights in Brazil under the treaty results in the suspension of their equivalent rights in Portugal, even though they remain Portuguese citizens.

Unlike naturalization, the equality of rights under this treaty does not include the right to a Brazilian passport.

=== Visa-free travel ===
Visa requirements for Brazilian citizens Brazil Passport not required. Travel with a Brazilian identity card Visa free Visa issued upon arrival eVisa Visa available both on arrival or online Visa required

Visa requirements for Brazilian citizens are administrative entry restrictions by the authorities of other states placed on citizens of Brazil. As of 2023, Brazilian citizens had visa-free or visa on arrival access to 169 countries and territories, ranking the Brazilian passport 17th (dense) in terms of travel freedom according to the Henley Passport Index.

== History ==
In 1822, Brazil declared independence from Portugal and established the Empire of Brazil under Pedro I, who had been living in exile in the country since 1808. The nation's first constitution was adopted in 1824 and provided that Brazilian citizens were free-born or emancipated men who were born in Brazil, unless their father was a foreigner in the service of another nation. Legitimate children born abroad to a Brazilian father, or illegitimate children born to a Brazilian mother, could establish nationality by becoming domiciled in Brazil; however residence was waived if their father was in government service. Portuguese nationals and naturalized foreigners who resided in Brazil at the time of independence were naturalized by residence in the empire. Citizenship could be lost if one was naturalized in another country or accepted employment or honors from foreign governments without the approval of the crown.

In 1860, to eliminate Brazilian nationality law conflicts with European legislation, Brazil passed Decree 1,096, which clarified the status of children born in Brazil to foreign parents who were not in government service, and married women. The decree specified that minor children shared family nationality, but upon reaching their majority would be entitled to Brazilian nationality and rights of citizens. Article 2 provided that upon marriage a woman took the nationality of her husband, but could repatriate if her husband died and she re-established residence in Brazil. Immigration legislation passed in 1890 barred people of African or Asian descent from the country. The law was modified in 1892 to allow Chinese and Japanese laborers. The 1824 constitution remained in force until the First Brazilian Republic adopted the Constitution of 1891. The republican constitution was modeled on the United States Constitution. Despite feminists' efforts the Constituent Congress denied them the rights of citizens. (Note: Article 70, section 1 barred from voting beggars, illiterates, active duty servicemen, and members of communities, congregations, religious orders, or societies of any denomination who took a vow of obedience, or subjected themselves to a rule or law which implies that they had surrendered their individual liberty. The first Civil Code in Brazil, adopted in 1916, specified that married women were restricted from certain acts and confirmed that husbands were the legal representatives for the family.) It provided, as amended in 1926, that children born in Brazil were birthright nationals of the country unless their foreign parents were residing in Brazil because of government service to another nation. The legitimate child born abroad to a Brazilian father was considered to have his father's nationality as long as he established a home in Brazil. The domicile requirement could be waived for a child whose father was employed abroad in service to the government. Only the illegitimate child born abroad to a Brazilian mother could derive nationality from her, on the condition of establishing residency in Brazil.

Decree No. 6,948, of 14 May 1908, stipulated that a foreigner, regardless of gender, who married a Brazilian, or who had Brazilian children, and resided in Brazil derived Brazilian nationality unless they declared in the proper legal manner that they chose to retain their original nationality. In 1932, Decree 21,076, which established the first Electoral Code of Brazil, outlined in article 2 that the rights of citizenship were not dependent on sex, and in article 3(b) that Brazilian women could not lose their nationality as a result of marriage. In 1933, Gilberto Amado and Lucillo Antonio da Cunha Bueno, the Brazilian delegates to the Pan-American Union's Montevideo conference, signed the Inter-American Convention on the Nationality of Women, which became effective in 1934, without legal reservations. That year, a new constitution was adopted, keeping most of the provisions of naturalization specified by its 1891 predecessor. It specified that nationality could be lost by obtaining dual citizenship. From 1907 to 1934, racial exclusions were not specified in immigration law, but in the latter year, a quota system was devised to limit immigration from certain countries. Since 1995, consent is required for loss of Brazilian citizenship for dual nationals.

== See also ==
- Brazilian identity card
- Brazilian passport
- Cadastro de Pessoas Físicas
- History of Brazilian nationality
- Visa policy of Brazil
- Equality Statute between Brazil and Portugal
