= RNE =

RNE may refer to:

- Radio Nacional de España
- Registro Nacional de Estrangeiros
- Russian National Unity (Russian Russkoe natsionalnoe edinstvo), neo-Nazi political party and paramilitary organization in Russia
