= Brazilian identity card =

National identity card of Brazil

Brazilian identity card (Carteira de identidade Nacional)
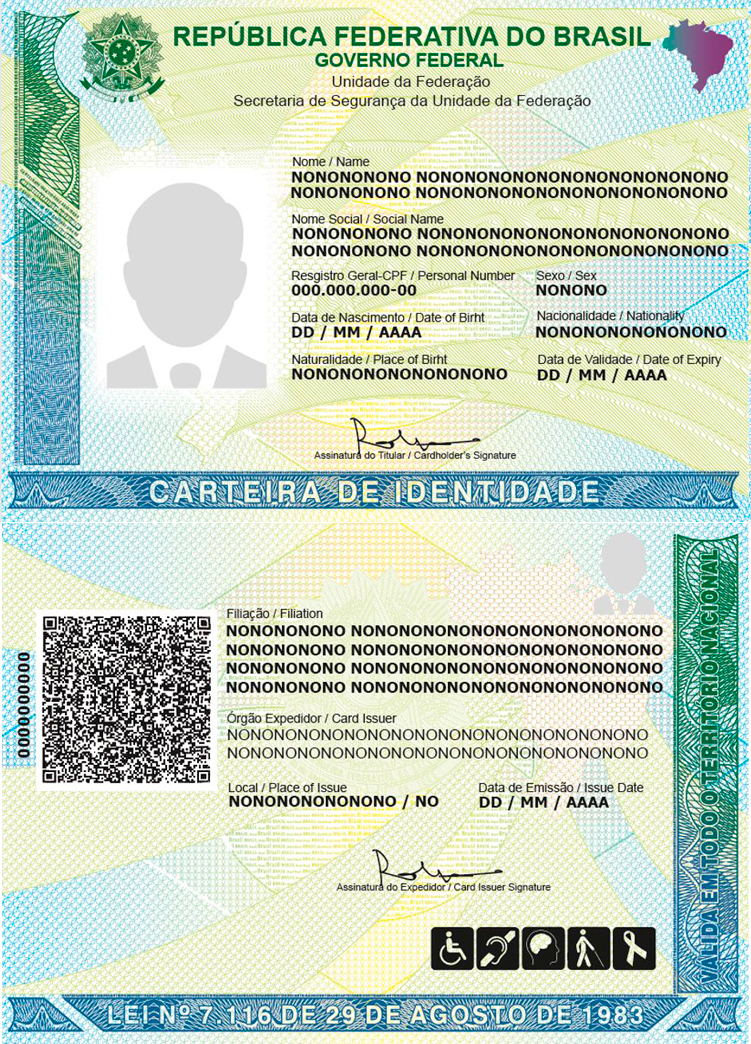
- New model of identity card (in paper) issued by the federative units from the year 2023.
- Type: Identity card
- Issued by: Civil Police: AC, DF, GO, MA, MG, PA, PB, PE, PI, PR, RO, RR and SP; Scientifical Police: AL, AM, AP, BA, CE, ES, MS, MT, RN, RS, SC, SE and TO; Traffic Department: RJ
- Purpose: Proof of identity
- Valid in: Brazil (Note: The document is also valid for entry in countries members of Mercosur and its associates (except for Guyana, Suriname and Panama).)
- Eligibility: Brazilian citizenship or Portuguese citizenship (under the Equality Statute between Brazil and Portugal)
- Expiration: 10 years (people aged 12 to 60); 5 years (people aged under 12); Undetermined (people aged over 60)
- Cost: First issue: free; Second issue: accordingly to federative unit issuer

Carteira de identidade Nacional (National Identity Card in Portuguese) is the official national identity document in Brazil. It is often informally called carteira de identidade (identity card), "RG" ([ɛʁiˈʒe]) (from Registro Geral, General Registry) or simply identidade. The card contains the name of the bearer, filiation, place of birth, date of birth, signature and thumbprint of the bearer. Other national documents can legally be used as an identity card, such as a federative unit-issued driver's license, passport or, for minors, a birth certificate. Each card has a unique RG number. As of 11 January 2023, the CPF number will be used as the RG number on new identity cards.

Brazilian identity cards can be used as travel documents to enter the Mercosur members (Argentina, Bolivia, Paraguay, Uruguay) and associated countries (Peru, Chile, Colombia, Ecuador; except Guyana, Suriname and Panama).

== Issuance ==
Having and carrying an RG card is not compulsory under law, but it is compulsory to carry some form of identification, so it is common for all citizens to have and carry one.

Its issuance is the responsibility of the governments of the federative units of Brazil and are valid nationwide. There is no legal restriction on having more than one identity card, provided each one is issued by a different federative units.

The documents required to obtaining an identity card depend on whether the applicant is single, married or naturalized. Single people need a birth certificate (the original or a certified copy), while married people can use their marriage certificate, and naturalized people can use a naturalization certificate.

Since 11 January 2023, applicants are required to have a CPF number to obtain an identity card. If an applicant does not have a CPF number, the issuing authority will register a CPF for the applicant.

== Appearance ==
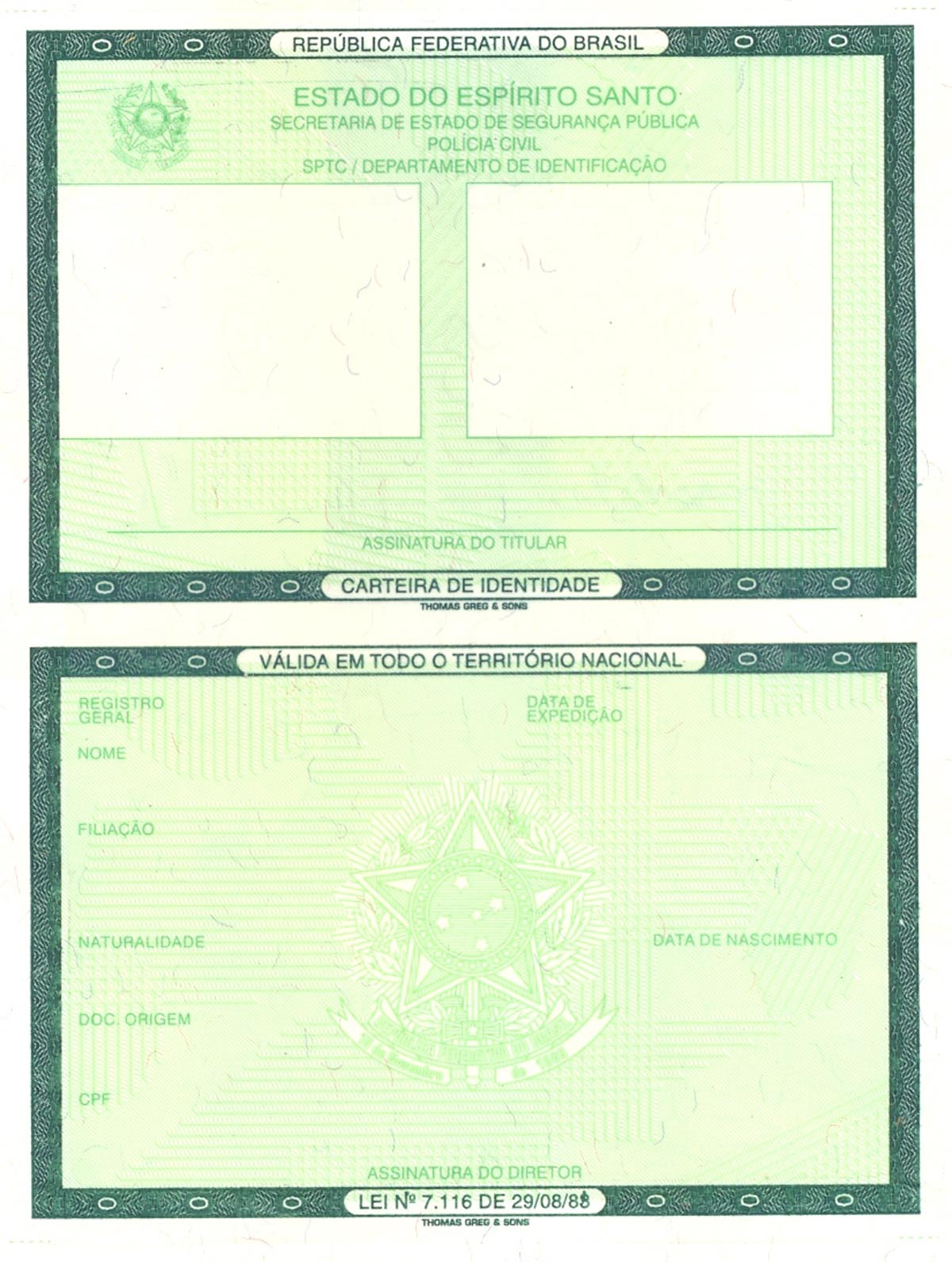
Old model of identity card (in paper) issued by federative units.

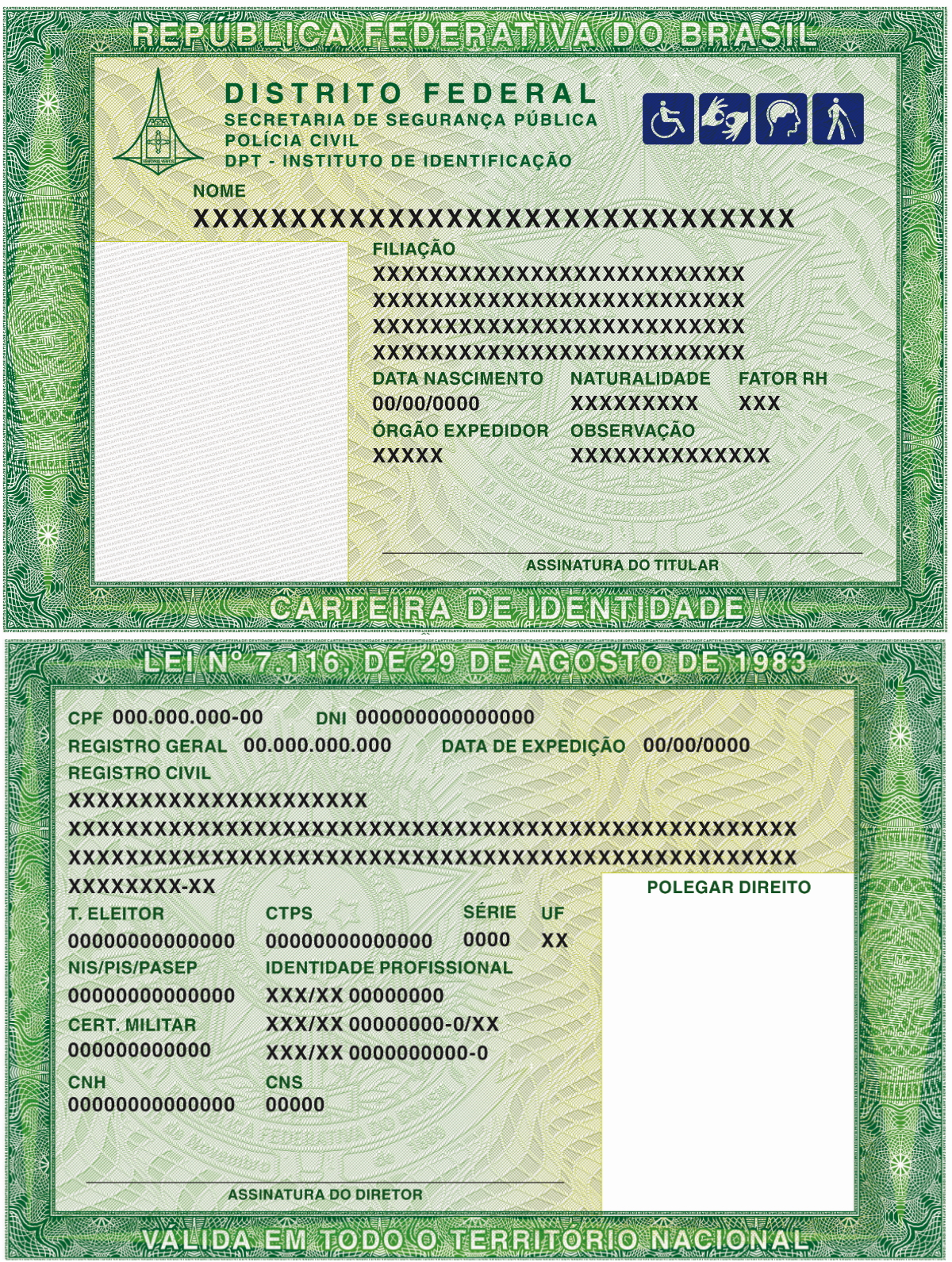
New model of identity card (in paper) issued by the federative units from the year 2022 to early 2024

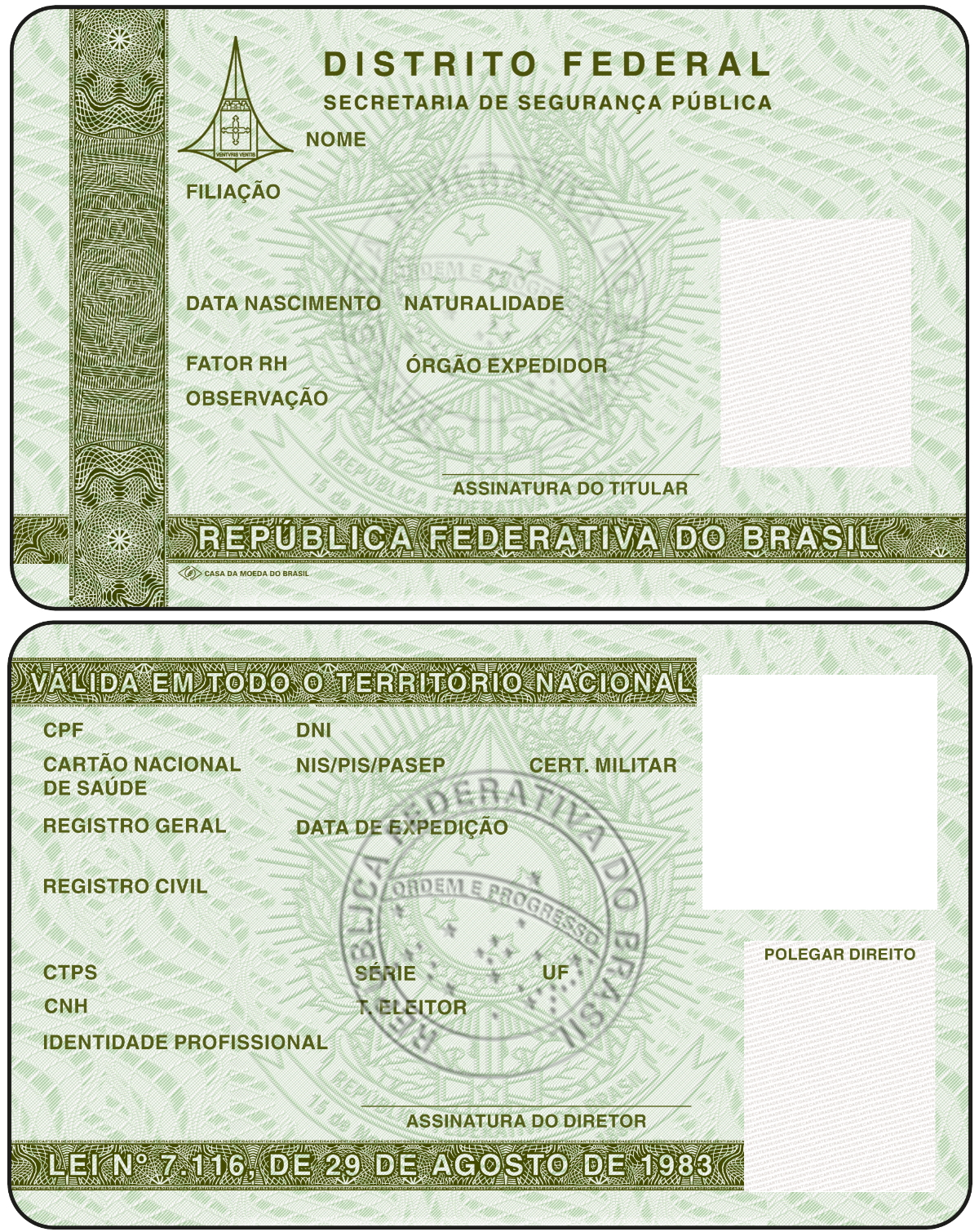
Model of identity card (in plastic) provided for by law but not implemented.

There is a national standard form of the card, but each issuing federative unit may introduce minor adjustments, usually concerning the numbering scheme, font, and the respective seal. The card printed in security paper measures 170x60 mm open and 85x60 mm closed, whereas the card in polycarbonate format measures 85.6x53.98 mm. As of 2017, cards are no longer laminated and laminating new cards is forbidden, as they have machine-readable information printed on the inside. Bearers may protect their IDs by storing them in a small plastic cover that is issued with the card.

== Contents ==
=== Front ===
- Full name of issuing federative unit
- A 3x4 cm photograph of the bearer
- Full name and social name of the bearer
- CPF number
- Sex (M, F or X)
- Birth date
- Nationality (BRA, PRT or naturalized)
- Issue date
- Birthplace (locality and the federated unit code, or country of birth – if born abroad)
- Expiration date
- Signature or an observation waiving it (for an illiterate bearer)

=== Back ===
- QR code
- Filiation (the legal ascendant(s))
- Name of issuing federation secretariat
- Issue place
- Issue date
- Card issuer signature
- Icon for people with disabilities or special needs (optional)
- MRZ code (physical card only)

== Legal status ==
An identity card is commonly required for activities including obtaining a driver's license, opening a bank account, buying or selling real estate, financing debts, applying for a job, giving testimony in court, and entering some public buildings. The police may ask to see the identity card of anyone who is detained, arrested, or searched.

There is no penalty for not carrying an identity card or another valid identification document, but the police are entitled to escort a person found without one to a police station for a search of electronic police records and a criminal background check.

=== Substitute identity documents ===
Several other documents are acceptable instead of the identity card, including a federative unit-issued driver's license, passport, professional identity card issued by a trade union, military identity card, civil servant identity card or worker's registry. The actual driver's license contains RG and CPF numbers and can substitute both.

All documents accepted in lieu of a federative unit-issued identity card include a reference to the RG number of the federative unit that issued the identity card. A standard federative unit-issued ID is required to obtain a passport, professional ID, driver's license or any other kind of substitute ID. Once an individual is registered with an RG, they can use a substitute document to register in any federative unit.

==== Portuguese citizens ====
Since Decree No. 70.391 in 1972, Portuguese citizens benefiting from equal citizenship status are eligible for regular Brazilian identity cards. They enjoy a reciprocal special regimen in recognition of Brazil and Portugal's special relationship. They bear the writing Nacionalidade Portuguesa - Decreto nº 70.391/72, meaning "Portuguese nationality - Decree No. 70.391/72".

== Unifying registers ==
=== 'Civil Identity Register' ===
Federal Law 9,454/1997 called for the merging of the federative unit-level registration (RG) systems into a unified, new numbering system: the Registro de Identidade Civil (Portuguese for 'Civil Identity Register'; RNI).

The Federal Police has proposed a new ID card with a standard design to go with the changes. The new card has security features to deter counterfeiting; the introduction of an embedded Near field communication (NFC) chip is also being considered.

In February 2017, the Chamber of Deputies approved the project to put the new ID card into force, which would be called Identificação Civil Nacional (Portuguese for 'National Civil Identification'; ICN). However, the draft law was put on hold for undetermined time.

=== 'National Identity Document' ===
On April 5, 2017, the Senate Constitution and Justice Commission approved the bill with the proposal to gather the data from the states' General Registries (RG), the National Driver's License (CNH) and the Electoral Title registries, and the Physical Persons Register (CPF) in a single document. After approval by Congress, the law was sanctioned by former President Michel Temer on May 11, 2017, and published in the Diário Oficial da União the next day. However, the inclusion of the National Driver's License was banned from the original text, due to the possible need for retention by transit agencies, and also the Passport, which is required to be a document of its own.

The database is called Identificação Civil Nacional (Portuguese for 'National Civil Identification'; ICN), while the document was initially called Documento Nacional de Identidade (Portuguese for 'National Identity Document'; DNI). The responsibility for managing the data of the single document was mandated to the Superior Electoral Court, and the pilot project was launched on February 5, 2018.

On February 11, 2019, the Secretary of Digital Government of the Ministry of Economy, Luis Felipe Salin Monteiro, announced the use of the CPF number as the general register for the DNI.

=== New unified identity card ===
As per the Decree no. 10.977 of 23 February 2022, the new ID card was designed, and all 26 states and the Federal District were required to issue the new ID card starting 6 November 2023.

Any applicant can choose between two physical versions: a modern plastic ID-1 card or a classic paper-based card. Applicants who choose the plastic-based card must sign a declaration recording their choice and pay a fee, while the paper-based card is issued free of charge. The previous versions of the ID card will continue to be valid for 10 years starting from the date of publication of the Decree no. 10.977, that is until 28 February 2032, except for people over 60 years old, whose ID cards remain valid indefinitely. A digital version is be available for portable devices.

== See also ==
- Brazilian passport
- Brazilian nationality law
- Visa requirements for Brazilian citizens
- Visa policy of Brazil
