= Equality Statute between Brazil and Portugal =

Treaty between Brazil and Portugal

The Equality Statute (Portuguese: Estatuto da Igualdade) is an agreement signed between Brazil and Portugal in Brasília on 7 September 1971, which guarantees Portuguese nationals in Brazil and Brazilians in Portugal equal rights and duties with their respective nationals.

Subsequently, the provision was reaffirmed in the Treaty of Friendship, Cooperation and Consultation between the Federative Republic of Brazil and the Portuguese Republic, signed in Porto Seguro on 21 April 2000, on the 500th anniversary of the Discovery of Brazil.

== Benefits ==
The Statute guarantees the equivalence of rights between the two countries. Thus, a Brazilian can exercise their political rights in Portugal, being able to vote and to be elected, while a Portuguese can offer public competition (and pursue a political career) in Brazil. Brazilian citizens in Portugal who benefit from this status are allowed to acquire the Portuguese citizen card, as well as the Portuguese in Brazil can request the Brazilian identity card.

The only exception is in relation to the respective economic blocs of each country: A Brazilian does not have full freedom of movement within the European Union (though holders of a Brazilian passport have visa-free access in all countries of the Schengen Area, this is time-limited), while the Portuguese do not have the rights of Brazilians within Mercosur, that is, the agreement is only within the countries, rather than an agreement between economic blocs.

== See also ==
- Brazilian nationality law
- Portuguese nationality law
- Brazil–Portugal relations
- Citizen Card (Portugal)
- Brazilian identity card
