= History of Brazilian nationality =

Located in South America, Brazil is the fifth largest and fifth most populous nation in the world. First discovered by Portuguese explorer Pedro Álvares Cabral on April 22, 1500, it remained a Portuguese colony until it declared its independence on September 7, 1822.

== Brazilian nationality prior to independence ==
Brazil's economy was largely based on agriculture and mining; specifically the production of sugar and tobacco for export. As a result, land was concentrated in the hands of relatively few wealthy, plantation-owning families, and production was largely dependent on slave labor. The intermixing of these Europeans and Blacks, as well as the native Indians of the territory, helped create a unique people and culture.

The social, economic, and political hierarchy of this period was largely based on race; with Europeans occupying the upper ranks and the non-whites subsequent ranks below them. Despite these internal divisions, Brazil possessed a number of factors that aided in the formation of nationalist sentiments among the elite.

"[...]First its unity of territory. Brazil stretches unbroken from the Amazon in the north to the Rio de la Plata in the south, and from the Atlantic coast to the foothills of the Andes[...] The vast majority of the people speak Portuguese and are Roman Catholic. Their language differentiates them from their Spanish speaking neighbors[...]"

A growing nationalistic trend in literature, and the emergence of colonial born elites created a sense of pride and attachment to the territory of Brazil and a distancing from Portugal. The revolutions in America, France, and the Spanish America along with the maturation of Brazil as a colony furthered nationalist sentiments.

=== Role of the Napoleonic Wars in Brazilian independence ===
Despite its natural geographic barriers and the distinct culture of its inhabitants, Brazilian independence would only be realized after a series of events set in motion by the Napoleonic Wars.

In 1807, Portugal was invaded by Napoleon forcing prince regent Dom Joao to flee to Brazil along with other members of the royal family, and a number of notables and functionaries. This effectively making Brazil the seat of the Portuguese government.

While in Brazil, Dom Joao instituted a number of reforms and decrees, most notably the one on December 16, 1815, which designated the Portuguese dominions the "United Kingdom of Portugal, Brazil, and the Algarves", making Brazil coequal with Portugal.

After the French withdrawal from Portugal, mounting pressure from the Cortes (Portuguese parliament) forced the return of Dom Joao (now King John VI) in 1821. He appointed his son, Dom Pedro, regent in his place. Looking to return Brazil to its formerly dependent colonial status, the Cortes repealed many of the decrees and reforms of King John VI, and demanded Dom Pedro's return to Europe.

Defying the Cortes, Dom Pedro formed a legislative and constituent assembly on June 3, 1822, and declared Brazil's independence on September 7, 1822. He was crowned Brazil's first emperor on December 1.

=== Recognition of Brazil as a nation ===
- The United States recognized Brazil as a new nation in 1824. Portugal followed a year later.
- In 1827, a treaty between Brazil and Britain was signed. By signing the treaty Brazil agreed to abolish the slave trade within three years, and grant Britain a favored position in its markets in return for Britain's recognition of its independence.

== Evolutions ==
=== Government ===
Since its independence Brazil has been subject to a lot of internal unrest resulting in several years of military rule and the promulgation of several different constitutions, the most recent one being passed in 1988. While political change has been frequent, the social and economic realities in Brazil have remained largely the same.

"Throughout modern Brazilian history every change of political regime-from the establishment of an independent empire in the early 1820s to the establishment of a modern representative democracy in the late 1980s- has demonstrated the extraordinary capacity of the Brazilian elites to defend the status quo and their own interests by controlling, co-opting and, if necessary, repressing the forces in favor of radical social change[...]",

While political and military developments in Europe helped lead to Brazilian independence, it was also partially a result of the Brazilian elites. The plantation owners backed Pedro's declaration of independence because it granted them greater freedom to conduct trade and the opportunity to expand their overseas markets. The emerging urban elite saw, who occupied an insecure position between plantation owners and slaves saw it as a way to improve their status. Once agreed upon, independence was secured quickly and peacefully, with no concessions being made to the underprivileged groups in society. "The transition from colony to independent empire was characterized by political, economic, and social continuity."

Subsequent governments and constitutions were also largely the result of elite initiatives.

=== Political incorporation and suffrage ===
==== Imperial Constitution ====
Under the Imperial Constitution, power was concentrated in the hands of the hereditary emperor who had the power to appoint ministers, counselors of state, provincial presidents, and the Senate. The Chamber of Deputies was elected by a small segment of the population. Though the government was only responsible to it in a limited extent.

Despite this, political participation of this period was surprisingly high. Men who were twenty-five years old (twenty-one if married), Catholic, born free, with quite low annual income had the right to vote in the elections of the Chamber of Deputies. These elections were however indirect. They elected eleitores, who were required to have a higher annual income, further restricting electoral participation. And only the eleitores had the right to vote on the deputies.

The initial rates of high political participation were eventually restricted in the latter parts of the nineteenth century. A gradual shift from slave to free labor, made abolition seem inevitable. This created a growing fear among both rural and urban elites that emancipated slaves would acquire the property necessary to secure the right to vote.

To quell this fear, the Savaria Law was passed in 1881. Under this law the Chamber of Deputies would be directly elected, the voting age was lowered to twenty-one, and the property/income qualification to vote was removed. It also allowed non-Catholics and former slaves to become eligible voters. Most importantly, it required people to pass a literacy test in order to gain the right to vote.

Rather than extend political participation, the literacy tests greatly restricted it because eighty to eighty-five percent of the population at this time was illiterate. Therefore, this literacy requirement counteracted the other democratic advances of the Savaria Law.

===== Abolition of slavery =====
The Constitution of the Empire and subsequent laws all failed to deem slaves as citizens. Instead, slaves were still "excluded from the political community, from exercise of any political right, from all participation in national sovereignty of public authority." However, the Constitution did allow libertos (freed slaves) to vote in elections, provided that they met the property income requirements.

Despite its promise to Britain to abolish the slave trade within three years of its 1827 treaty, Brazil continued to import slaves up until the 1850s. It was only after economic and political conditions permitted, that government initiatives were undertaken to abolish the slavery.

November 1866: immersed in the Paraguayan War and anxious to recruit troops, an Imperial Government decree permits slaves to serve in the Brazilian army, and in return would be granted their freedom unconditionally.

In 1871, the Law of the Free Womb was passed, which declared that all children subsequently born to slave mothers would be free. A loop hole allowed the master to refuse the government indemnity payment offered for the child at age 8, and thus, retain the child until 21. The children of slaves who were freed at the age of eight were turned over to the Imperial government and entitled to learn how to read and write in government institutions or through private tutors. However, the masters who opted to retain the children had no obligation to educate them. This had the effect of excluding them from formal political participation, after their freedom, because of their illiteracy.

In 1885, the Sexagenarian Law was passed. This unconditionally freed slaves over sixty.

On May 13, 1888, Princess Isabel, acting in place of her ailing father Pedro II, signed the law that abolished slavery in Brazil, granting no compensation to slave owners. This freed 700,000 slaves.

==== Republican constitution ====
The entire executive branch (president, state governor, and municipal prefeito) as well as the Senate and the Chamber of Deputies, state assemblies and municipal councils were all elected. However, fraud, intimidation, violence and the exercise of patronage by local landowners and agents of the grown was widespread. The presidential elections of this period were predetermined by state governors, and state elections were dominated by the Republican parties. Despite this, and the limitations remaining of suffrage, the early years of the Republic did allow for a substantial advance in direct popular participation in comparison with the late empire.

==== From Vargas to the military coup ====
The revolution of 1930 effectively ended the Old Republic, and brought Getúlio Vargas to power. He undertook a policy which sought to increase political incorporation within Brazil. Rather than focus on extending political and economic rights, Vargas focused on the expansion of social rights in an attempt to control the process of economic growth and modernization.

A 1931 electoral law lowered the voting age to eighteen and granted woman the right to vote, making Brazil the second country in Americas to do so. By 1933, the first woman had been elected to the Constituent Assembly.

The 1934 Social Charter in the Constitution guaranteed social rights to certain occupations, while neglecting rural labor and certain urban occupations. This resulted in a hierarchy of citizenship categories based on occupational prestige, defined along the lines of unequal welfare benefits.

The social rights guaranteed in this charter were closely tied to the urban labor market. In order to be entitled to health assistance, retirement funds and other welfare benefits it required one to be entered in a formal job contract. This form of regulated citizenship emerged from the government's need to control the process of economic growth and modernization. By granting these social rights the government increasingly drew people into the urban labor market, allowing for economic expansion and development. As a result, the state, under Vargas took the lead in promoting nation-building and industrial growth in Brazil.

After a 1945 electoral law was passed, men and women who were formally employed were automatically registered to vote. This was an attempt to expand political participation among the urban working class, while still largely neglected the rural population. The same year voting is also made mandatory.

The Constitution of 1946 still restricted political participation on the basis of literacy, disenfranchising more than half of the population as a result.

An act of Congress in 1950 restored individual responsibility over voter registration. This restricted the political participation of urban workers, who had previously been automatically registered as a result of their employment.

==== Military coup of 1964 ====
One of the key factors responsible for this military coup was the political mobilization of the rural lower classes. This threatened to undermine a tenet central to the government led modernization, the exclusion of the lower rural classes from citizenship. As a result, the military took power, inaugurating twenty-one years of military dictatorship, which would be marked by further involvement of the state in economic development and political repression.

To extend political incorporation the regime tried to generalize access to social rights, first by unifying the welfare system, and also by partially extending social rights to rural laborers. The continuous growth of the labor market helped incorporate people into the citizenship model based on social rights.

This increasing concentration of populations in urban centers created a strong demand on public goods and services, which was only exacerbated with the economic crisis of the 1980s. Further adding to the situation, the growth of urban employment in the informal economy not only restricted access of social rights to this segment of the population, but weakened the tax basis for the welfare state. Under these circumstances, the minority with secured jobs and access to social rights essentially became a privileged segment of the population. This only increased the political, social, and economic inequality that characterized Brazil.

== Democracy ==
1985 saw the return of civilian rule following the election of president José Sarney. Following his elections he passed a series of constitutional amendments which extended suffrage; most notably by removing the literacy requirement that restricted votership. The municipal elections of 1985 were the first elections in Brazil based on universal suffrage. The following years the elections of Congress and state governors were also based on universal suffrage. These developments represented an important step towards the institutionalization of democracy in Brazil.

=== Constitution of 1988 ===
The promulgation of a new constitution in 1988, marked the formal shift from a military dictatorship to a democracy in Brazil. It was followed in 1989 by the first direct presidential elections in thirty years, and the first presidential elections to be based upon universal suffrage.

It lifted official barriers to political participation and formally protected political rights. Like the constitutions before it, it denies status privileges and reaffirms the inviolability of private property and equality of all citizens before the law. It also strengthened the Afonso Arinos Law. Originally passed in 1951, it sought to punish racial discrimination by redefining racist practice as a crime rather than just a misdemeanor. Under the new constitution it went further, denying bail to those convicted of racial or colour prejudice, and stipulating prison sentences.

The constitution also restricted the power of the military, bolstered individual rights, and implemented means to protect marginalized groups.

== Racial inequality in Brazil ==
Poverty and inequality are persistent in Brazil, largely as a result the legacy of Portuguese colonialism and its dependence on slave labor. The social, economic and political development of Brazil only tended to increase inequality, primarily among the non-white population. "[It is] clear that the darker a Brazilian, the more likely he [is] to be found at the bottom of the socio-economic scale by every indicator- income, occupation, education [...] subtle but unmistakable discrimination in social relations remain[...] although it has never been codified since the colonial era."

Despite the transition from military dictatorship to democracy in Brazil, there remains a discrepancy between formal principles of the state the actualities of democracy in practice. The effects of skin color exemplify this fact, often perpetuating the inequalities that universal citizenship claimed to remove. Within Brazil, a large proportion of the population still lack basic citizenship rights, such as access to education. As a result, new forms of citizenship are developing independent of state control, like the situation in the favelas.

There is a growing social, political, economic and spatial exclusion of people living in informal urban settlements like favelas. As the state withdraws from providing social services from these areas, family and social networks step in and fill the gap. This caused a growing informalization of political activity among these groups, whereby these citizens identify their participation in the local community as the core feature of citizenship. They have moved them away from the national discourse of rights-based democratic practices as their definition of citizenship, towards one expressed through specific forms of community participation.

=== Indians ===
Since the time of European colonization, Indians have been marginalized spatially, politically, and economically. During the colonial period, the policy towards Indians was to exterminate them or to contain them in church settlements. From the establishment of the republic on, the state has actively pursued a policy aimed at assimilating these native groups, and integrating them into Brazilian society.

== See also ==
- History of Brazil
