= Brazilians in Portugal =

Ethnic group

Total population
- 276,200 (2.67% of total population)

Regions with significant populations
- Lisbon metropolitan area, Porto metropolitan area and Faro

Languages
- Portuguese (Brazilian and European)

Religion
- Christianity (mainly Roman Catholicism, some Protestantism, mostly Evangelical and Pentecostal), but also Irreligion, Spiritism, Afro-Brazilian Religions, Buddhism and possibly Judaism or Japanese new religions

Related ethnic groups
- Portuguese Brazilians, Brazilian diaspora, Brazilians, Brazilian British

Brazilians represent approximately 25% of the foreign population in Portugal. Their legal status varies according to several complex elements such as date of arrival and effective legalization processes available to them (1992, 1996, 2001, 2003), whether they are married to a national or they have Portuguese (or other European) ancestors, what their level of education and work experience is, etc. Therefore, many are legal residents, others have authorization to stay (autorizações de permanência), others, fewer, were able to legalized through the 2003 exceptional process and have working permits, and many others are still undocumented.

== Statistics ==
Official numbers, according to Serviço de Estrangeiros e Fronteiras, indicated that in 2005 there were 31,353 Brazilians living as legal residents, and other 39,961 had authorizations to stay, making a total of 71,314 people. About 15,000 were able to legalize thanks to the bi-national accord of 2003 (which is still open), thus there are about 86,000 Brazilians living in Portugal who have solved their legal status.

== Notable Portuguese people of Brazilian descent ==
- Bruno Alves – footballer
- Deco – footballer
- João Félix – footballer
- Liédson – footballer
- Tiago Monteiro – automobile racing driver
- Pepe – footballer
- Rony Lopes – footballer
- Quim Barreiros - singer

== See also ==
- Brazil–Portugal relations
- Portuguese Brazilians
- Brazilian diaspora
- Immigration to Portugal
