= Brazil–Portugal relations =

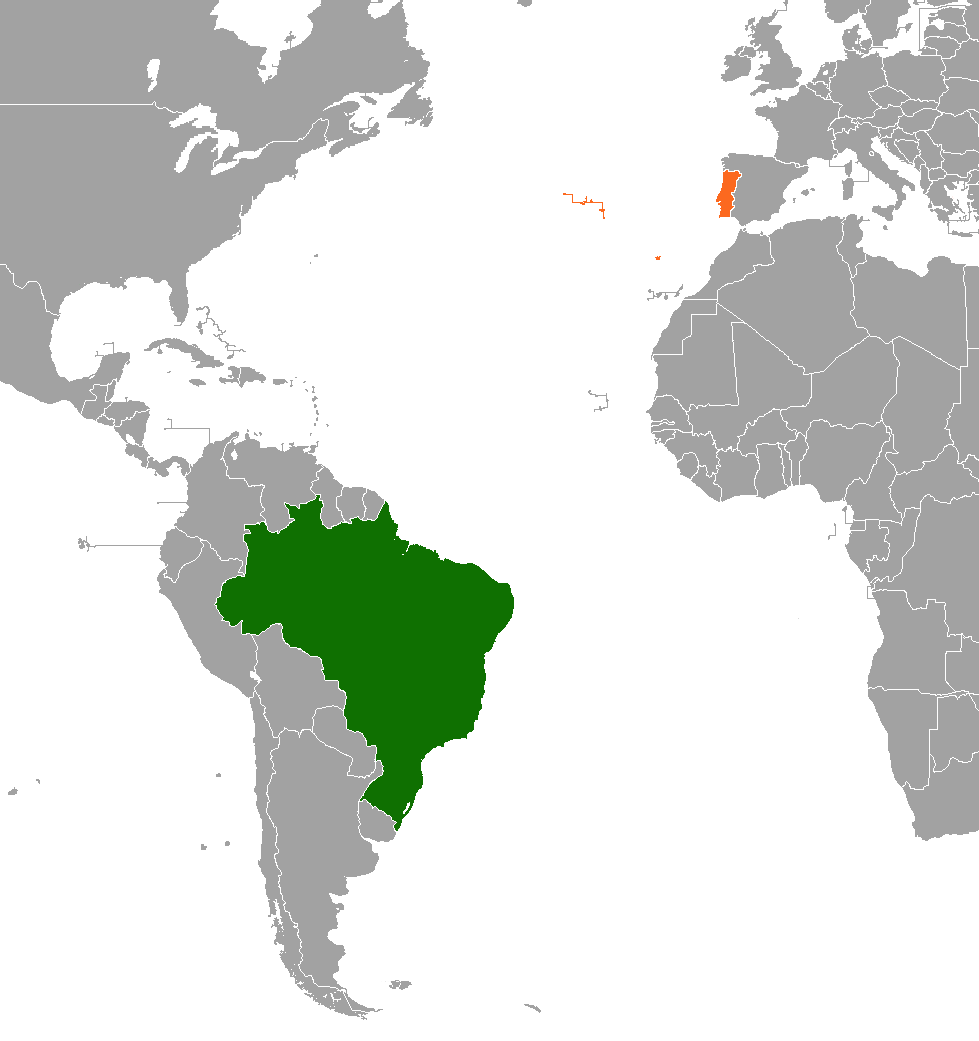
- Brazil: Portugal

Diplomatic mission
- Embassy of Brazil, Lisbon: Embassy of Portugal, Brasília

Envoy
- Brazilian Ambassador to Portugal Raimundo Carreiro: Portuguese Ambassador to Brazil Luís Faro Ramos

Brazil–Portugal relations (Portuguese: Relações Brasil-Portugal) have spanned nearly five centuries, beginning in 1532 with the establishment of São Vicente, the first Portuguese permanent settlement in the Americas, up to the present day. Relations between the two are intrinsically tied because the Kingdom of Portugal conquered and colonized the territory along the Atlantic coast of South America, then inhabited by various Indigenous communities, that would become Brazil.

Colonial Brazil (1500–1820) was ruled as a colony within the Portuguese empire. The Kingdom of Brazil (1815–1822) briefly united with Portugal as the United Kingdom of Portugal, Brazil and the Algarves, with the Brazilian city of Rio de Janeiro as its capital (1808–1821). Dom Pedro I of the Portuguese royal family proclaimed Brazil's independence and stayed to rule the Empire of Brazil (1822–1889) as the Portuguese court returned to Europe following the Liberal Revolution of 1820. In the Proclamation of the Republic (1889), brought an end to Braganza monarchical rule in Brazil and initiated First Brazilian Republic (1889–1930).

Brazil and Portugal continue to be bound by a common language and ancestral lines in Portuguese Brazilians, which can be traced back hundreds of years. Today, Brazil and Portugal share a privileged relationship, as evidenced in aligned political and diplomatic coordination, as well as economic, social, cultural, legal, technical and scientific cooperation.

According to a 2011 BBC poll, 76% of Portuguese people view Brazil's influence positively, with 8% viewing it negatively, the most favorable perception of Brazil for any other surveyed country in the world.

== History ==
=== Origins ===
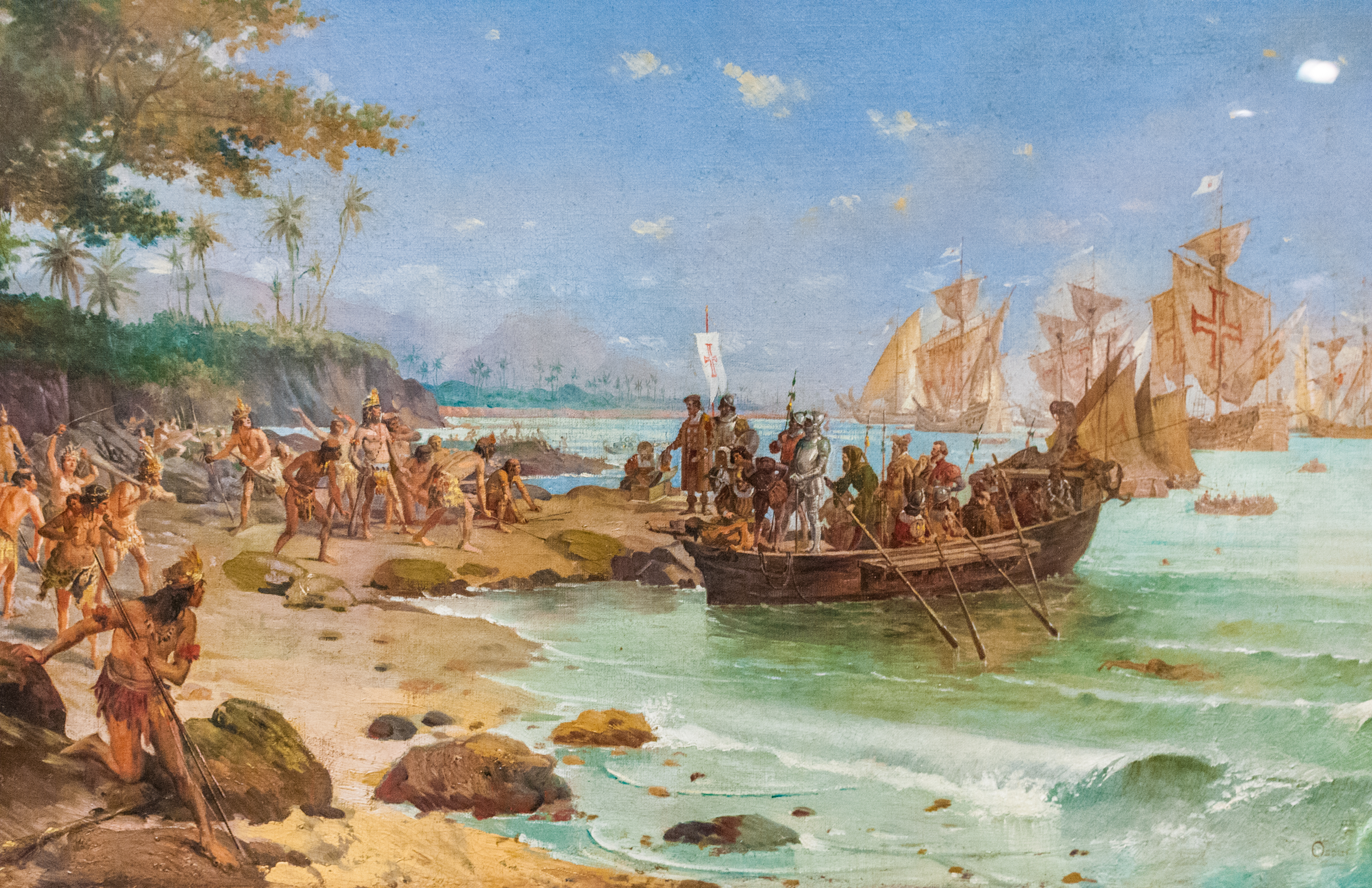
Cabral's landing in Porto Seguro, oil on canvas, Oscar Pereira da Silva, 1904.

In April 1500, Brazil was claimed by Portugal on the arrival of the Portuguese fleet commanded by Pedro Álvares Cabral. Until 1530 Portugal had yet to establish their first colony in Brazil. In the first century of settlement, the Portuguese realized it would be difficult to use the natives as slave labor. They were not docile, had high mortality when exposed to Western diseases and could run away and hide rather easily. So Portugal turned to imported African slaves for manual labor.

In the 16th and 17th centuries official revenue from Brazil was small — about 3 per cent of Portuguese public revenue in 1588 and 5 per cent in 1619. The economic activity was concentrated on a small population of settlers engaged in a highly profitable export–oriented sugarcane industry in the Northeast.

In the 1690s, the discovery of gold, and in the 1720s diamonds further south in Minas Gerais, opened new opportunities. The gold industry was at its peak around 1750, with production around 15 tons a year, but as the best deposits were exhausted, output and exports declined. In the first half of the 18th century profit remittances from gold averaged 5.23 million mil reis (£1.4 million) a year, of which the identifiable royal revenues were around 18 per cent. Total Brazilian gold shipments over the whole of the 18th century were between 800 and 850 tons.

=== Inconfidência Mineira ===
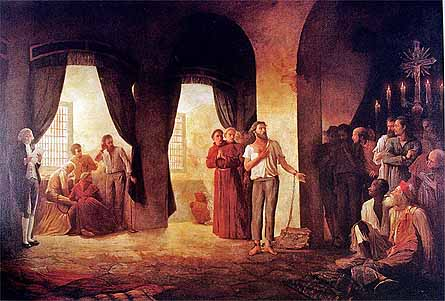
Reading of the sentence to the conspirators of the Inconfidência Mineira

The Inconfidência Mineira of 1788–1789, led by the patriot and revolutionary Joaquim José da Silva Xavier (popularly known as Tiradentes), was the first major movement against Portuguese rule in Brazil. It was triggered by taxes, including the detested quinto do ouro or "royal fifth," a 20% tax on the gold produced. as well as the derrama, an annual tax quota of 100 gold bars imposed on the state of Minas Gerais; if it was unmet, the Portuguese crown could force the Brazilian people to pay the remaining balance. Inspired by the American Revolution, a group including military men, clergymen, poets, and intellectuals from Minas Gerais conspired to rise up in rebellion on the day the derrama was imposed, but three individuals informed the colonial government and the participants were arrested. The uprising failed and the conspirators were arrested. Tiradentes was drawn and quartered and his remains were sent to Vila Rica (Ouro Preto) to be displayed.

=== United Kingdom of Portugal, Brazil and the Algarves ===
In 1808, the Portuguese ruler, Prince Regent John VI, fled to Rio de Janeiro to escape the French invasion of Portugal. He brought about 10,000 of the mainland establishment with him — the aristocracy, bureaucracy, and some of the military. For 13 years, Rio de Janeiro functioned as the capital of the Kingdom of Portugal in what some historians call a "metropolitan reversal"—i.e., a former colony exercising governance over the entirety of the Portuguese empire.

In 1815, during the Congress of Vienna, John VI created the United Kingdom of Portugal, Brazil and the Algarves, elevating Brazil to the same rank as Portugal and increasing the administrative independence of Brazil. Brazilian representatives were elected to the Portuguese Constitutional Courts. In 1816, with the death of Queen Maria, John VI was crowned King of Portugal and Brazil in Rio de Janeiro.

John VI faced a political crisis when groups in Portugal tried to reverse the metropolitanisation of their former colony. With the end of the Napoleonic Wars came calls for John to return to Lisbon and for Brazil to return to its previous colonial condition. By late 1821 the situation was becoming unbearable and John VI and the royal family returned to Portugal.

=== Independence of Brazil ===
Brazil's independence declaration as depicted in Pedro Américo's O Grito do Ipiranga, 1888.

The Portuguese Courts then demanded that Prince Pedro return to Portugal. As his father had advised him to do, the prince instead declared his intention to stay in Brazil in a speech known as the "Fico" ("I am staying"). Pedro proclaimed Brazilian independence on September 7, 1822 and subsequently became the first emperor of the country. There was some armed resistance from Portuguese garrisons in Brazil, but the struggle was brief. Portugal recognised Brazil's independence in 1825.

=== Revolta da Armada incident ===
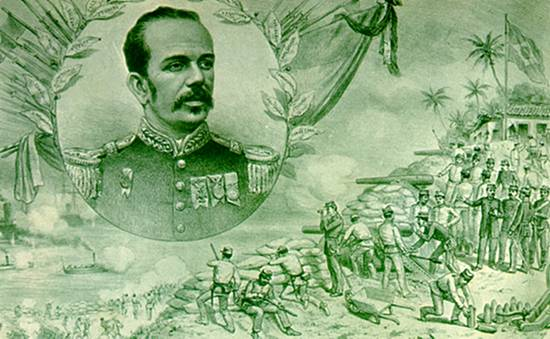
The Revolta da Armada in an illustration by Angelo Agostini.

In 1894 relations were strained between the two states after Portugal granted refuge to Brazilian rebels after the Revolta da Armada incident. Portugal had sent a naval force constituted by the warships Mindello and Affonso de Albuquerque to Rio de Janeiro to protect Portuguese interests during the naval rebellion against President Floriano Peixoto. On 2 April 1894, the uprising was crushed and 493 rebels, including 70 officers and the mutiny leader, Admiral Luís Filipe de Saldanha da Gama, sought refuge on board the Portuguese warships. Despite protests from the Brazilian government, Portugal granted refuge to the rebels and sailed to the Rio de la Plata, where most of the refugees disembarked. The incident was regarded as a violation of Brazilian sovereignty and led Brazil to sever diplomatic relations with Portugal. Diplomatic relations were re-established in 1895 by the Prudente de Morais administration.

=== 20th century ===
In the 20th century, relations between the two countries were shaped by Brazil's much greater size and more powerful economy. For this reason, Brazilian investment in Portugal in the 1970s and 1980s was considerably greater than Portuguese investment in Brazil.

== Political ties ==
Brazil and Portugal cooperate in multilateral fora, and have been partners in promoting U.N. reform. Portugal has lobbied for Brazil to become a permanent member of the United Nations Security Council. Brazil and Portugal are founding members of the Community of Portuguese Language Countries, an intergovernmental organization of former Portuguese colonies.

Brazil and Portugal signed the Friendship, Cooperation and Consultation treaty in Porto Seguro on April 22, 2000, during the 500th anniversary of the discovery of Brazil. This treaty regulates the cooperation of Portugal and Brazil in international fora, grants Brazilians in Portugal and Portuguese in Brazil equal rights under the Statute of Equality of Portuguese and Brazilians (Estatuto de igualdade entre portugueses e brasileiros); cultural, scientific, technological, economical, financial, commercial, fiscal, investment and several other forms of institutional cooperation were also addressed. In 2016, some memorandums were signed during the 12th Brazil-Portugal summit in Brasília, including on Antarctic cooperation.

The two states hold regular summit meetings to discuss bilateral and multilateral agreements and current topics. A major issue on the bilateral agenda in cultural matters is the joint promotion and diffusion of the Portuguese language.

== High-level visits ==
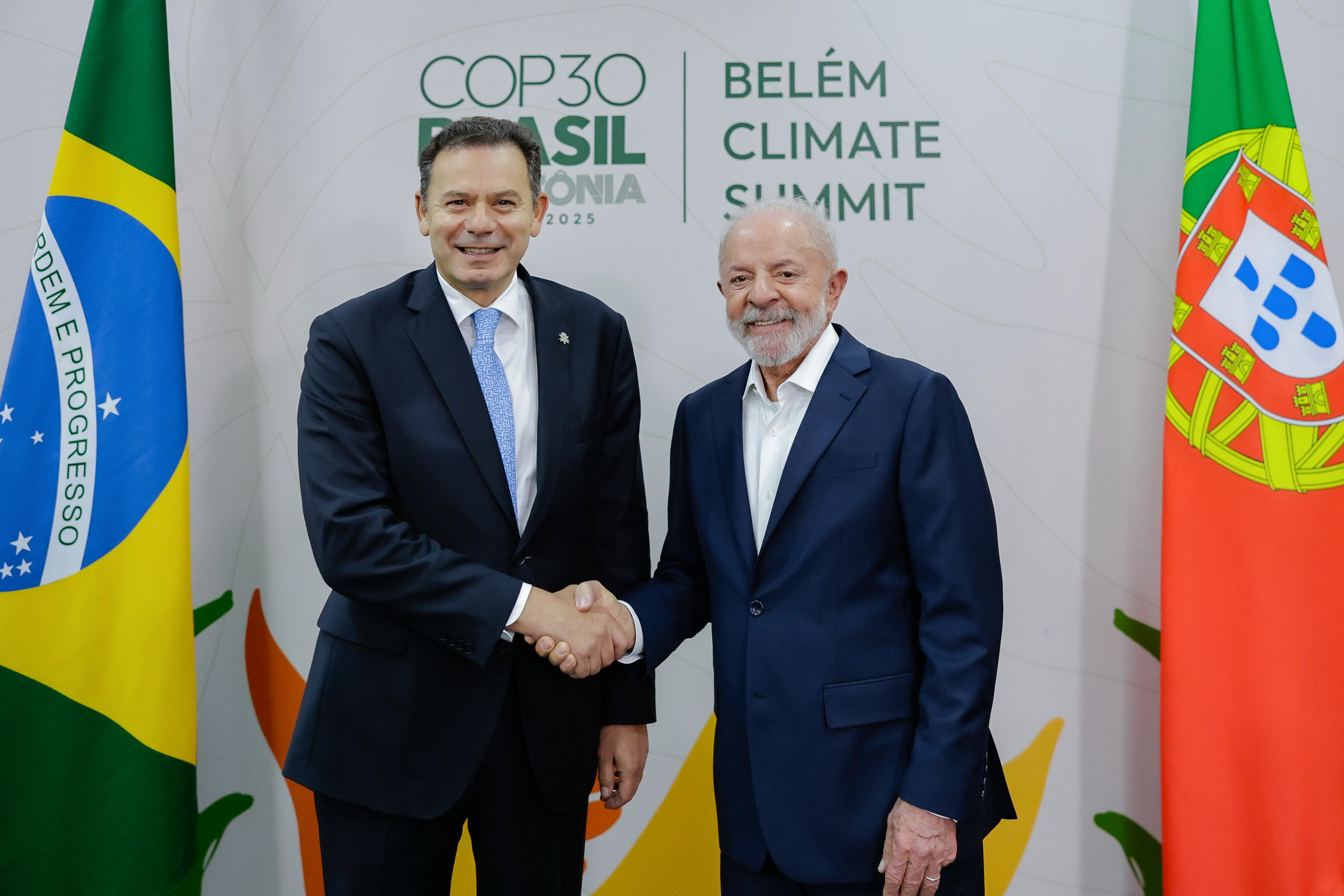
Portuguese Prime Minister Luís Montenegro and Brazilian President Luiz Inácio Lula da Silva in Belém, Brazil; November 2025.

Royal and Presidential visits from the Brazil to Portugal

- Emperor Pedro II of Brazil (1871, 1872, 1877, 1887)
- President Hermes da Fonseca (1910)
- President Juscelino Kubitschek (1960)
- President Emílio Garrastazu Médici (1973)
- President João Figueiredo (1981)
- President José Sarney (1986)
- President Fernando Collor de Mello (1990)
- President Fernando Henrique Cardoso (1995, 1998, 1999)
- President Luiz Inácio Lula da Silva (2003, 2005, 2007, 2008, 2009, 2010, 2023, 2026)
- President Dilma Rousseff (2011, 2013)
- President Michel Temer (January and August 2017)
- President Jair Bolsonaro (2019)

Presidential and Prime Ministerial visits from Portugal to Brazil

- President António José de Almeida (1922)
- President Francisco Craveiro Lopes (1957)
- Prime Minister Marcelo Caetano (1969, 1972)
- President Américo Tomás (1972)
- President Francisco da Costa Gomes (1975)
- President António Ramalho Eanes (1978)
- President Mário Soares (1987, 1988, 1989, 1993, 1994, 1995)
- Prime Minister Aníbal Cavaco Silva (1988, 1990, 1991, 1993)
- President Jorge Sampaio (1997, 2000)
- Prime Minister António Guterres (2001)
- Prime Minister José Manuel Barroso (2004)
- Prime Minister Pedro Santana Lopes (2004)
- Prime Minister José Sócrates (2006, 2010)
- President Aníbal Cavaco Silva (2008)
- Prime Minister Pedro Passos Coelho (2011, 2012, 2014)
- Prime Minister António Costa (2016)
- President Marcelo Rebelo de Sousa (2016, 2017, 2018, 2019, 2021, July, September and December 2022, 2023, 2025)
- Prime Minister Luís Montenegro (2024, 2025)

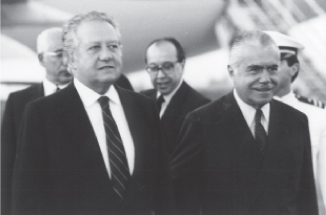
President José Sarney and President Mário Soares in Brazil; 1988.

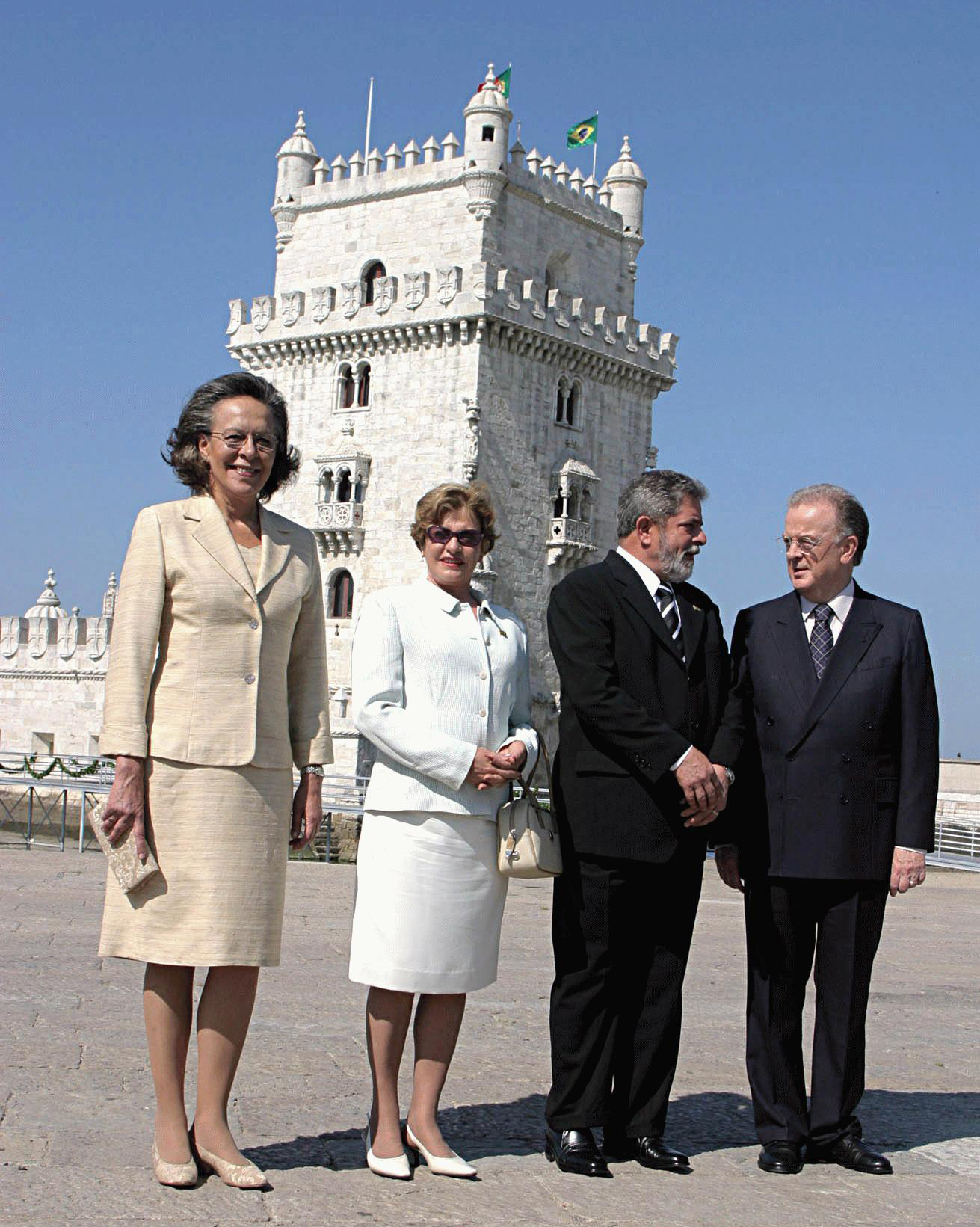
President Lula da Silva and President Jorge Sampaio in Lisbon, 2003.

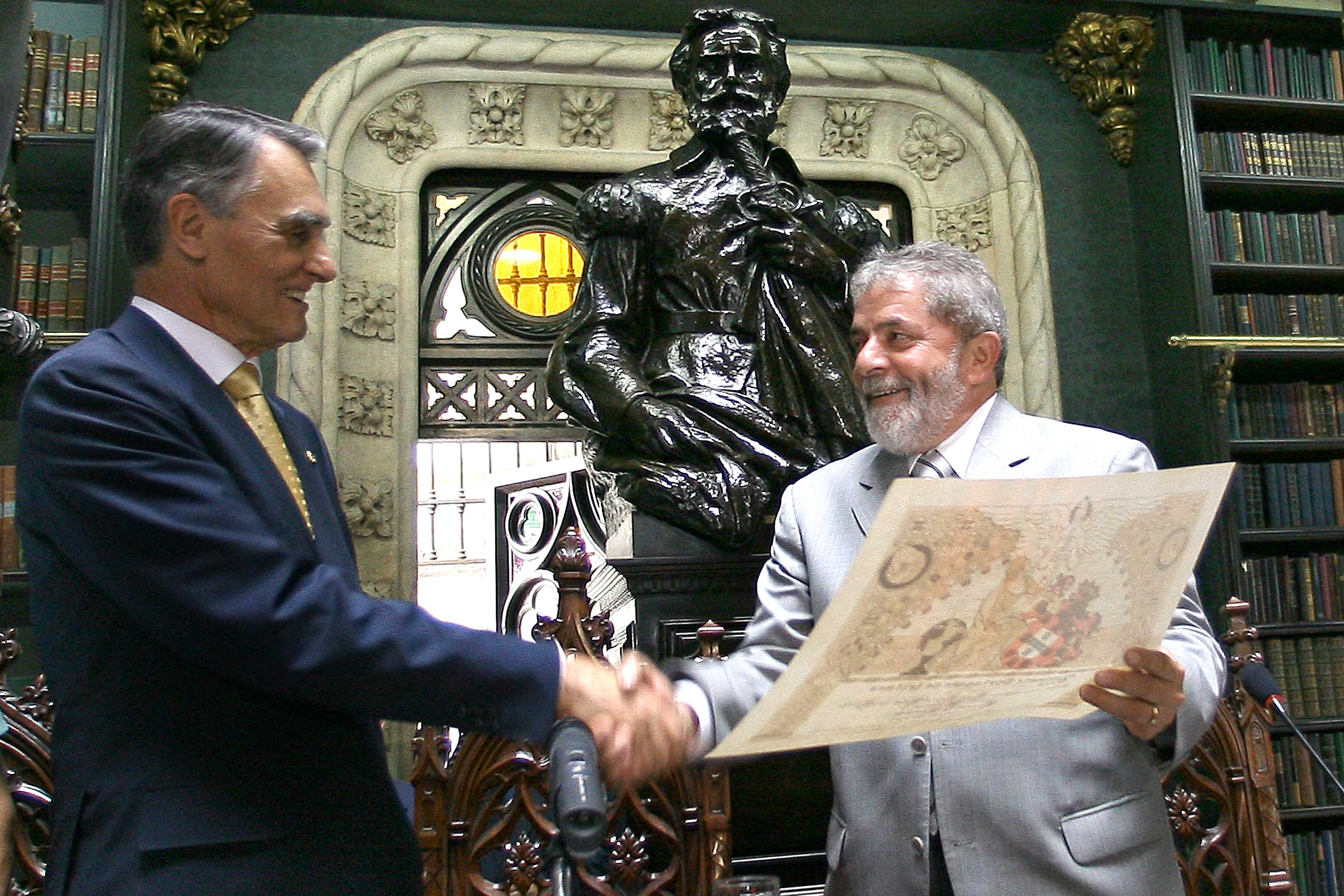
President Lula da Silva and President Aníbal Cavaco Silva receive the Laurel de Gratidão at the Royal Portuguese Cabinet of Reading in Rio de Janeiro, 2008.

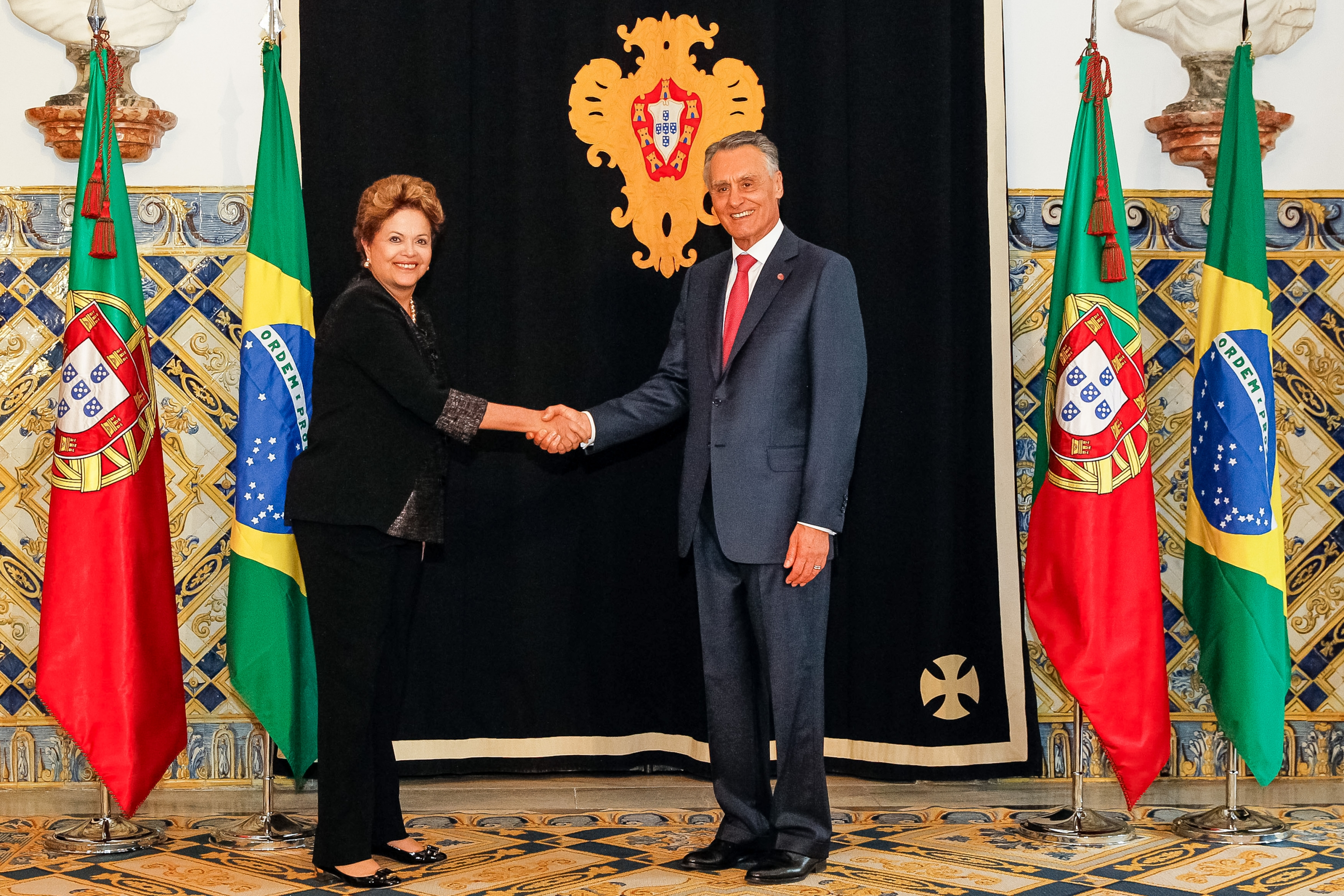
President Dilma Rousseff and President Aníbal Cavaco Silva in Lisbon, 2013.

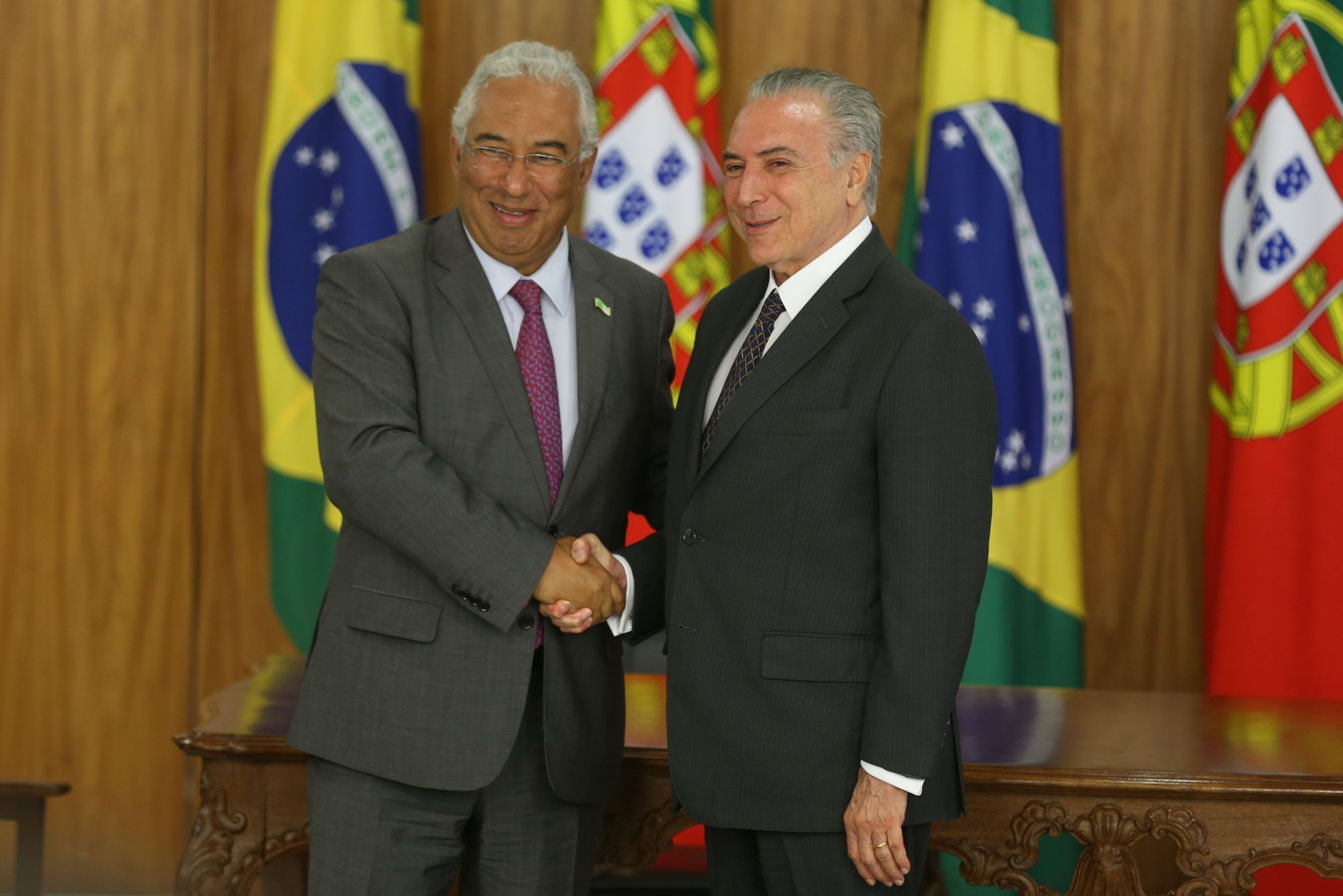
President Michel Temer and Prime Minister António Costa in Brasília, 2016.

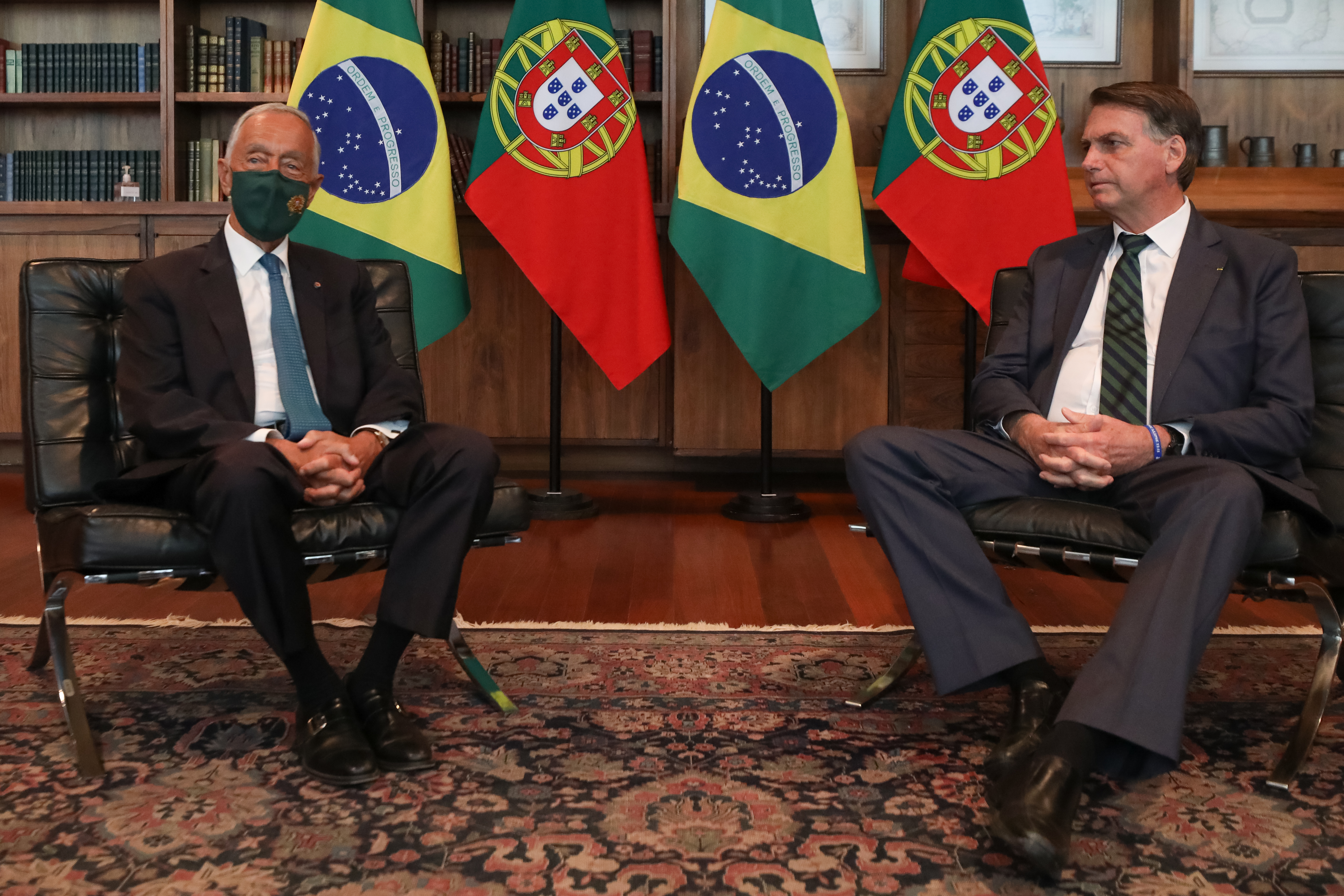
President Marcelo Rebelo de Sousa and President Jair Bolsonaro in Brasília, 2021.

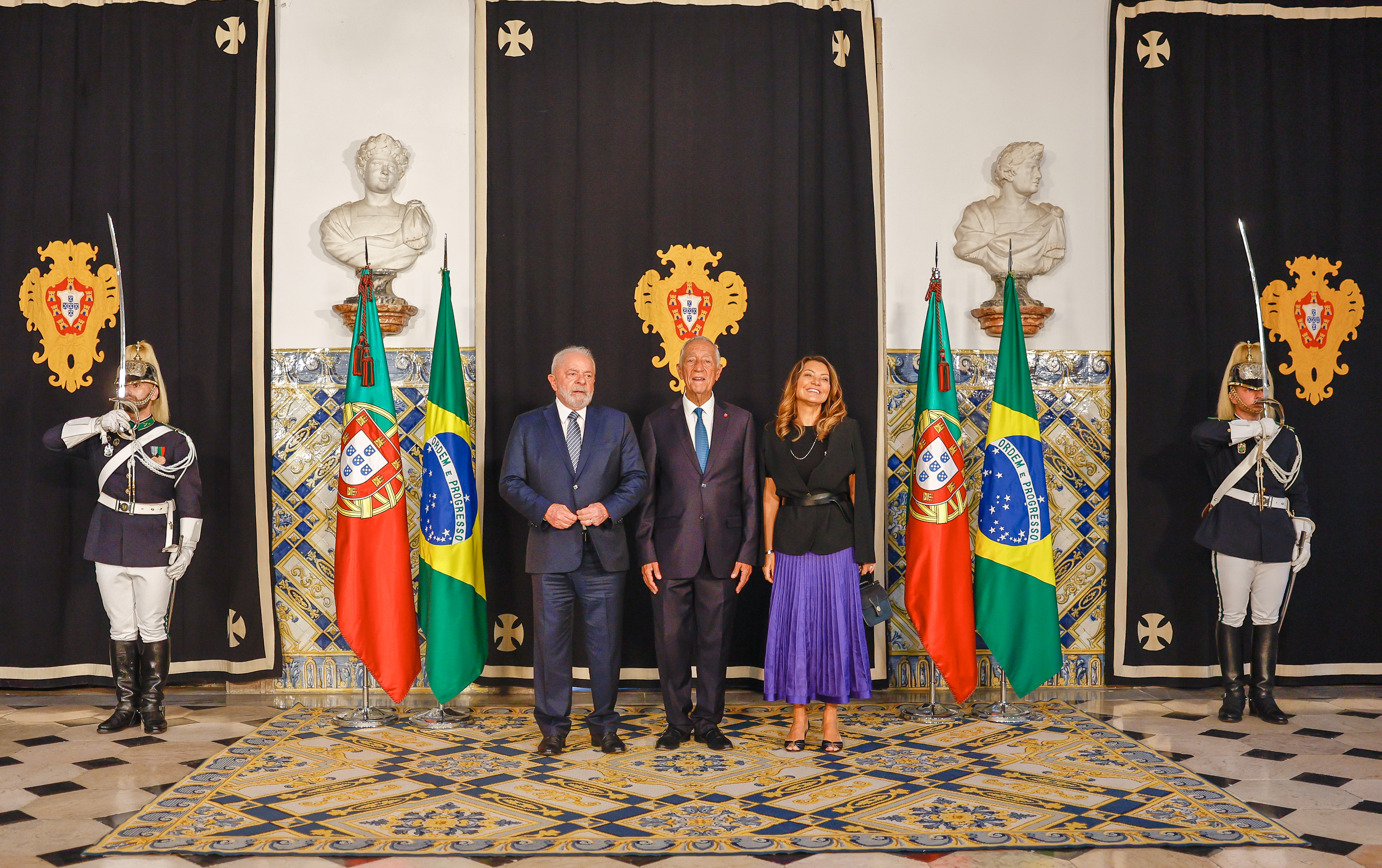
President Lula da Silva and President Marcelo Rebelo de Sousa in Lisbon, 2023.

== Economic ties ==
Both political and economic ties are important today. Companies from both countries were involved in mergers into the 2000s.

Relations between the two countries was said to be based on Brazil's sheer size, thus its economic market and generally more powerful economy. In the 1970s and 1980s, Brazilian investment in Portugal was thus much greater than Portuguese investment in Brazil.

In economic terms, Portugal's direct investment in Brazil has grown substantially, and there has also been steady growth in trade between the two nations.

== Cultural relations ==
In addition to a commonality of language and religion, both countries are members of ACOLOP and are parts of the Lusophone world.

Portugal is sometimes controversially called the "mother country" of Brazil. A statue of Pedro Alvares Cabral in Ibirapuera Park in São Paulo alleges that "Brazilians owe everything to Portugal." Brazil's independence from Portugal in 1822 was said to be one of the important reasons for Portugal's decline as a global leader.

The azulejos style of architecture prevalent in Brazil was derived from the era of Portuguese rule. Brazilian telenovelas are popular in Portugal. However, ethnic relations between the two were not strong and the "special relations" was said to have ended by the later 20th century, however, Portuguese citizens are still granted certain privileges under the Constitution that other foreigners do not have. A Portuguese community still exists in Brazil, as does a Brazilian community in Portugal. Portuguese is also said to have "united" Brazil where, in the 19th century, only segments of the country spoke the language with indigenous languages such as Tupi being prevalent. Following more settlers coming from Europe and African slaves, Portuguese became a universal language in the country.

However, Portuguese links with Brazil were weaker than that of other European empires like the United Kingdom, whose colonies sent soldiers to fight in both World Wars. Cultural dissimilarities also exist because of the native and African influence, both of whom adopted Portuguese names but retained an element of their own culture and "indigenised" it to make a "uniquely" Brazilian culture as in dance and other facets. These were adopted by Brazil's white population, but was not present in Portugal.

The two countries have also given special attention to the promotion and diffusion of the Portuguese language in the world. Brazil and Portugal have signed several bilateral agreements with the purpose of creating a unified orthography for the Portuguese language, to be used by all the countries that have Portuguese as their official language. Since 21 April 2000, Brazilian citizens can travel to Portugal (and vice versa) without a visa, on account of the "Status of Equality" treaty that was signed between the two states.

== Resident diplomatic missions ==
of Brazil in Portugal

- Lisbon (Embassy)
- Lisbon (Consulate-General)
- Faro (Consulate-General)
- Porto (Consulate-General)

of Portugal in Brazil

- Brasília (Embassy)
- Rio de Janeiro (Consulate-General)
- Salvador da Bahia (Consulate-General)
- São Paulo (Consulate-General)
- Belo Horizonte (Consulate)
- Belém (Vice-Consulate)
- Curitiba (Vice-Consulate)
- Fortaleza (Vice-Consulate)
- Porto Alegre (Vice-Consulate)
- Recife (Vice-Consulate)
- Santos (Consular Office)

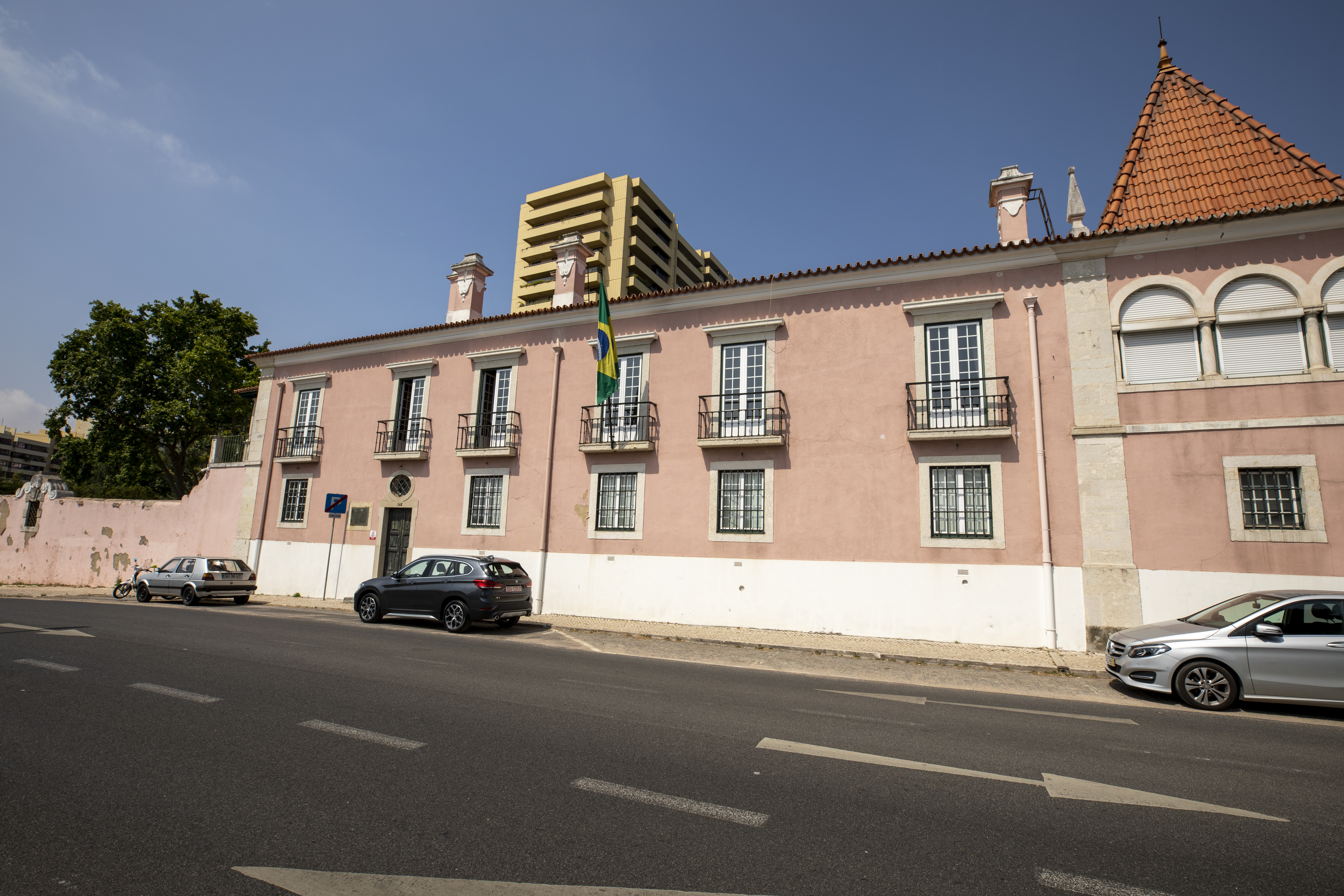
Embassy of Brazil in Lisbon

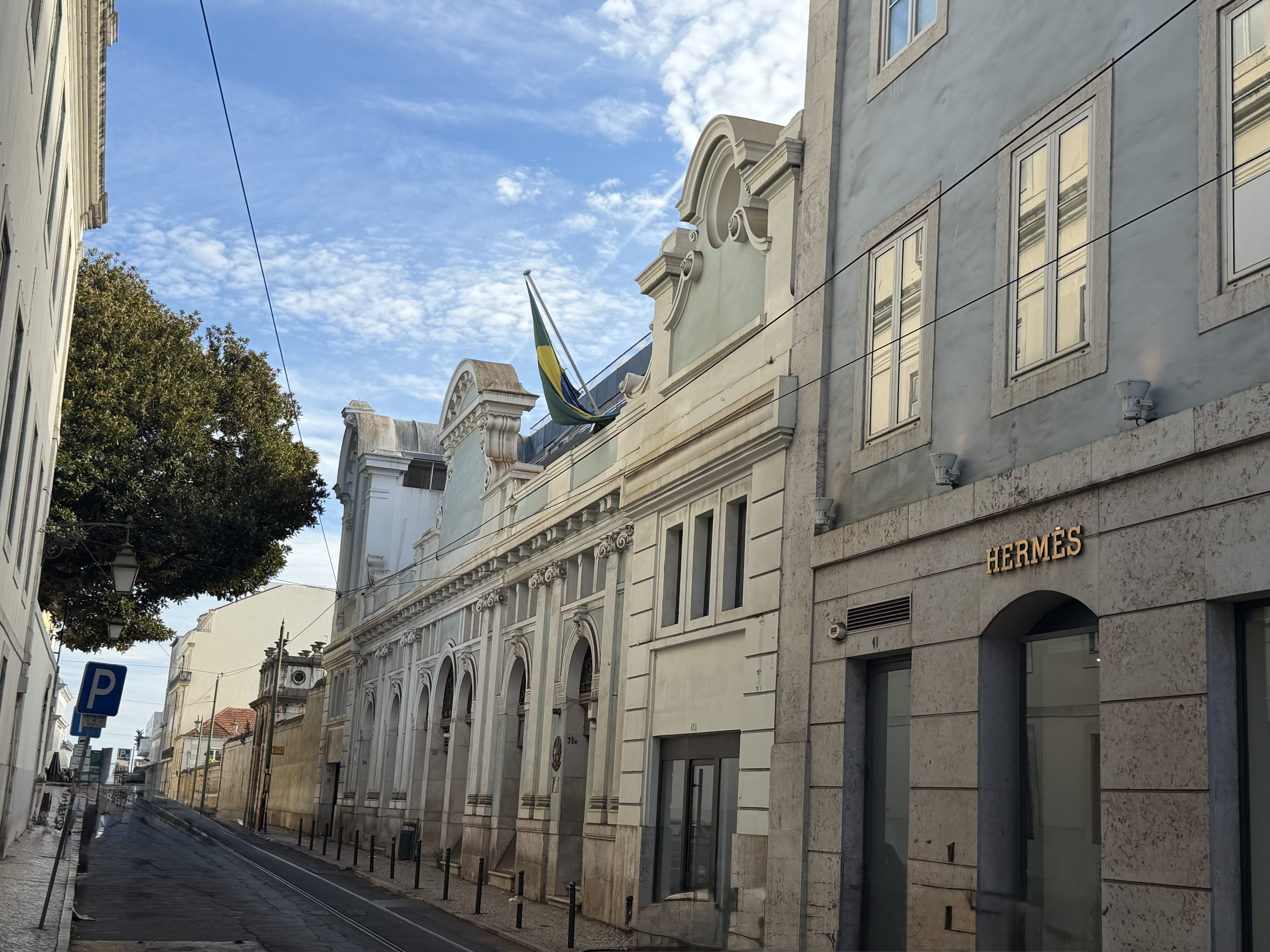
Consulate-General of Brazil in Lisbon

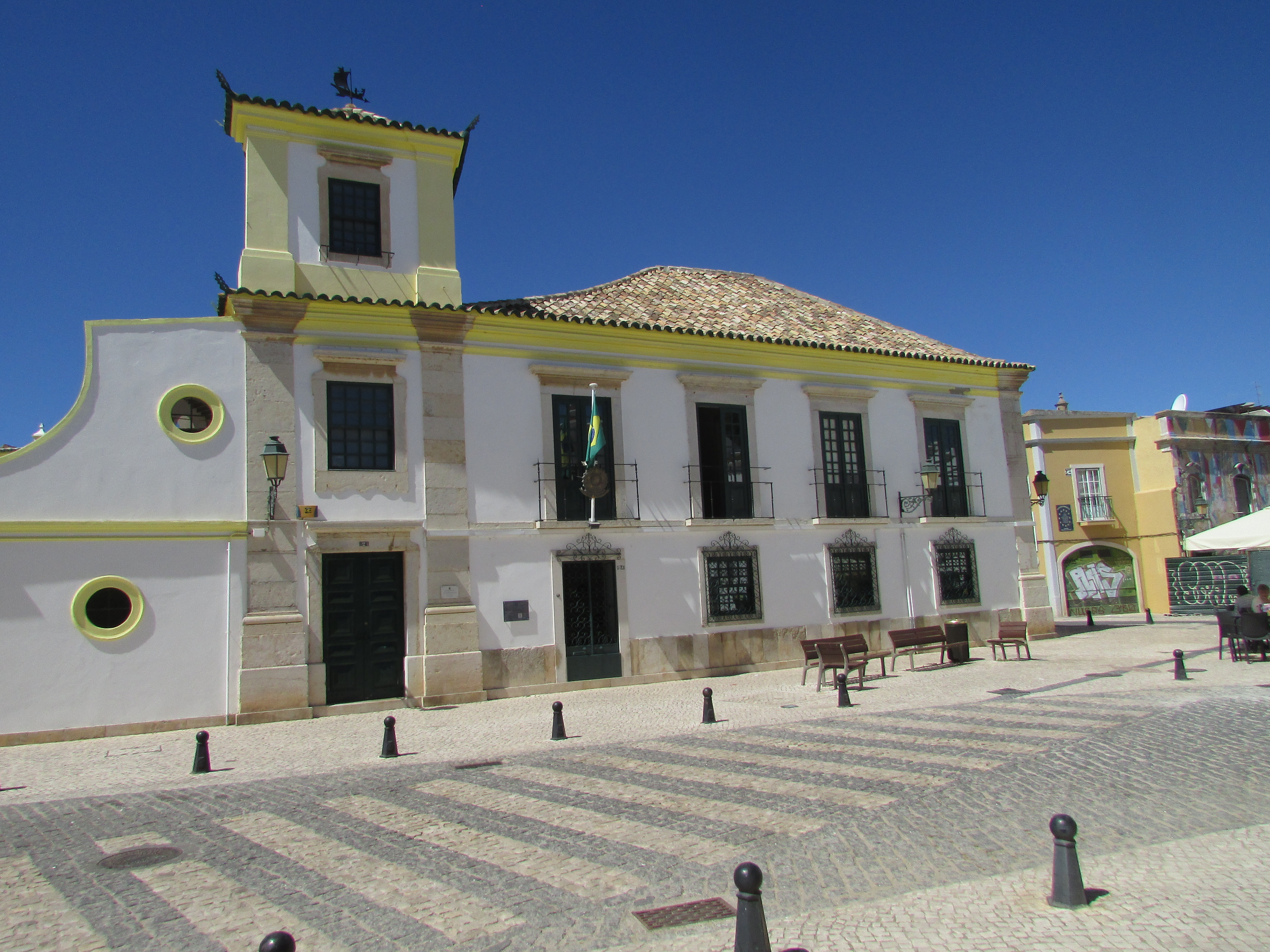
Consulate-General of Brazil in Faro

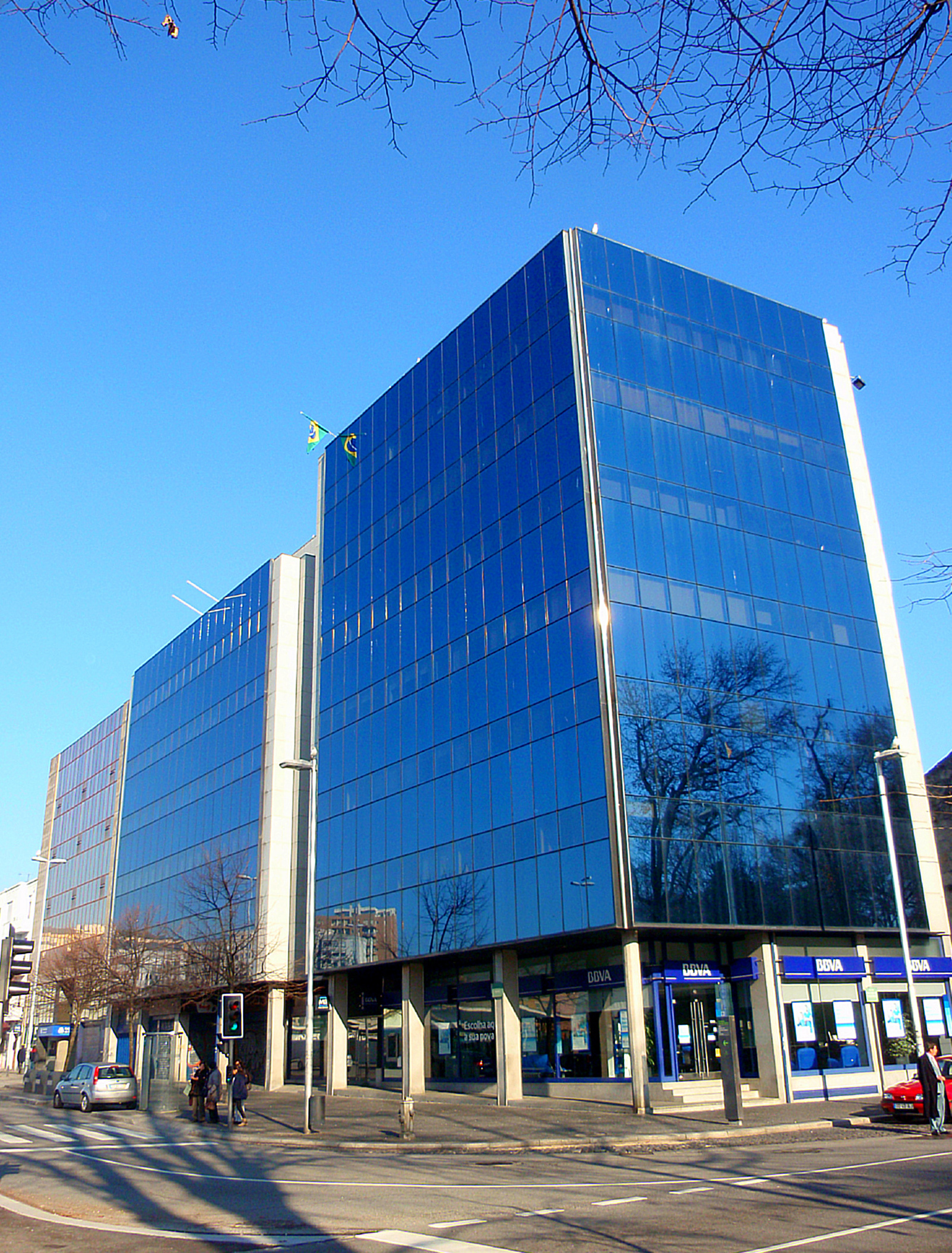
Consulate-General of Brazil in Porto
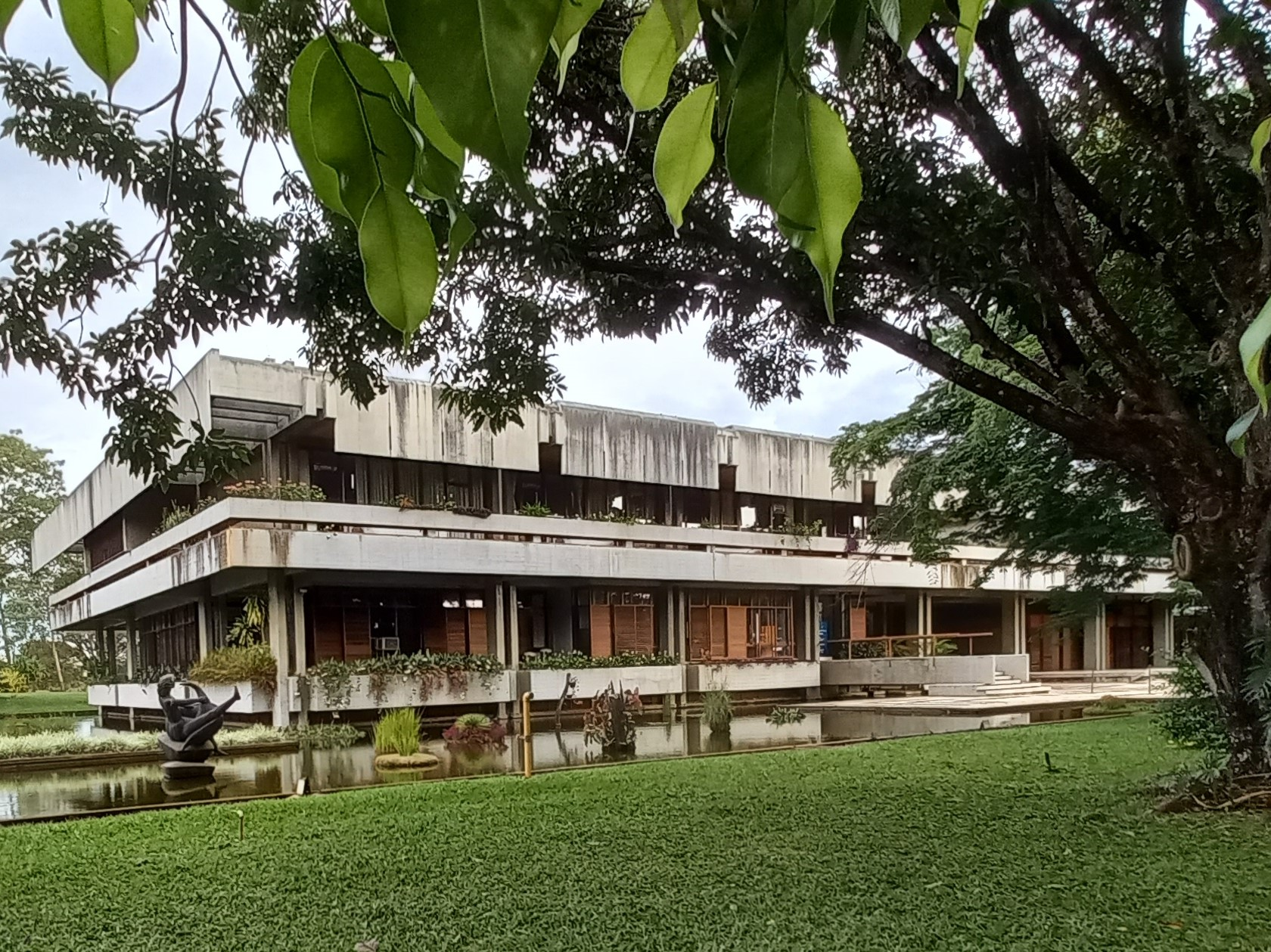
Embassy of Portugal in Brasília

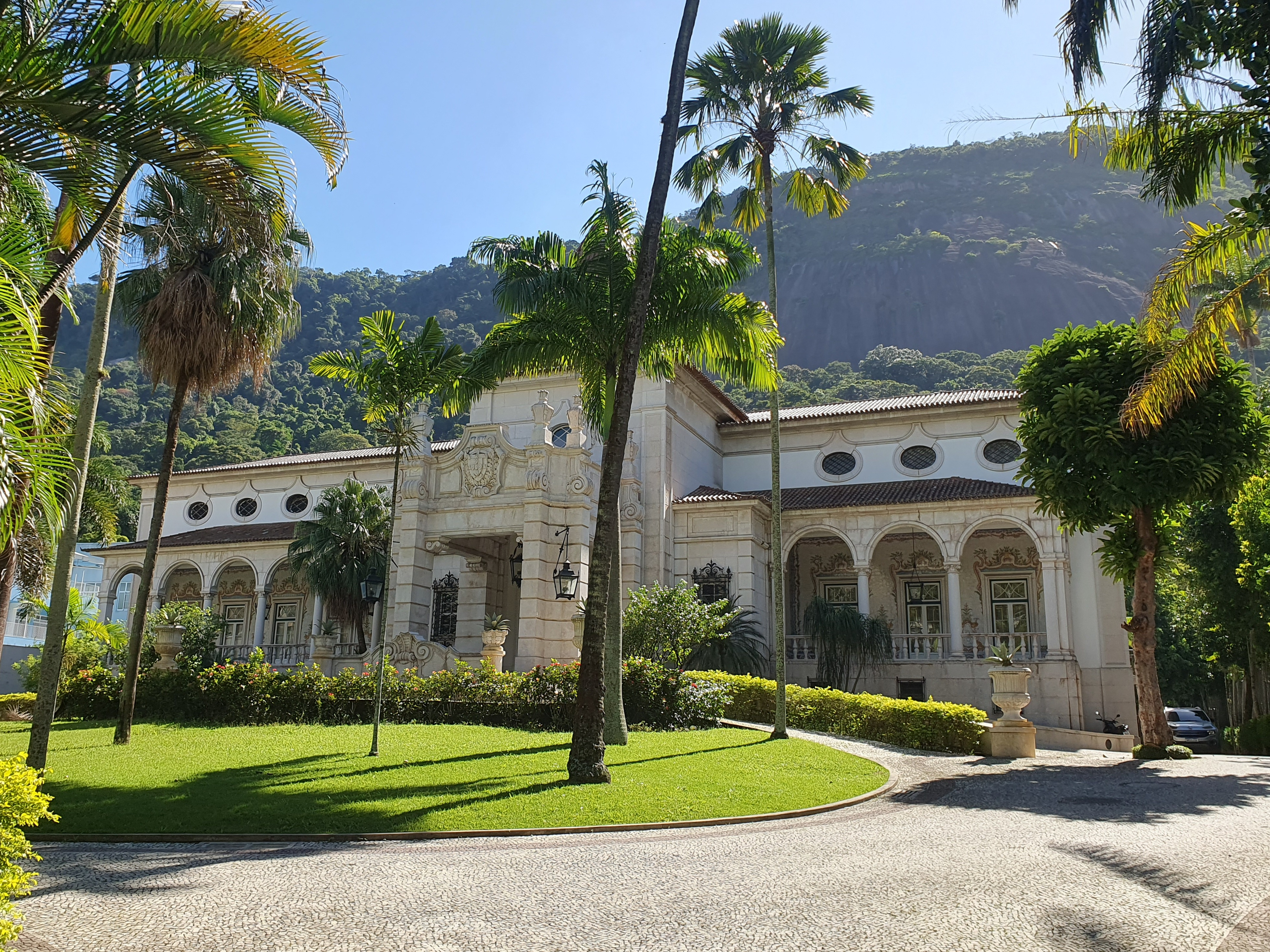
Consulate-General of Portugal in Rio de Janeiro

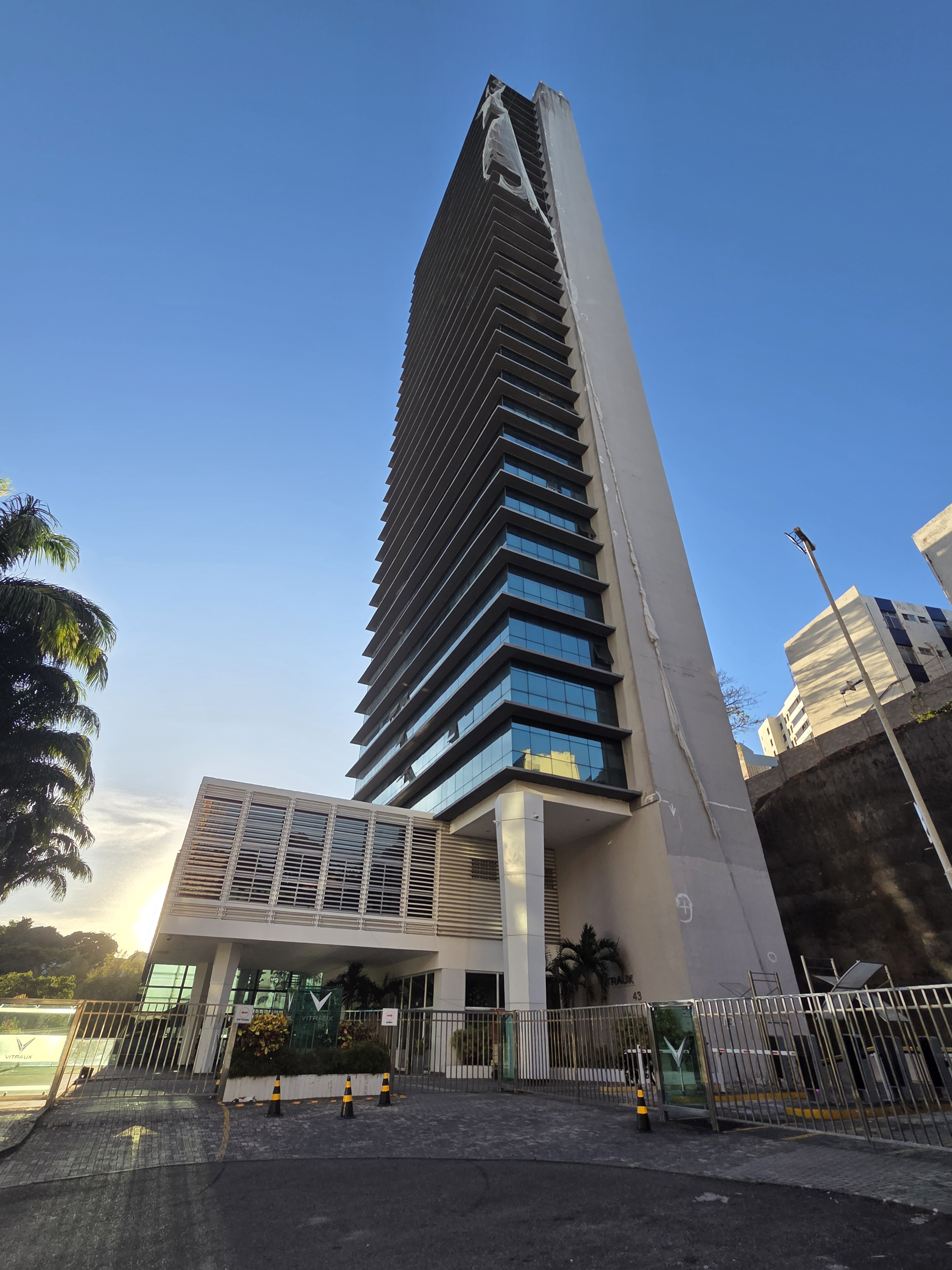
Building hosting the Consulate-General of Portugal in Salvador

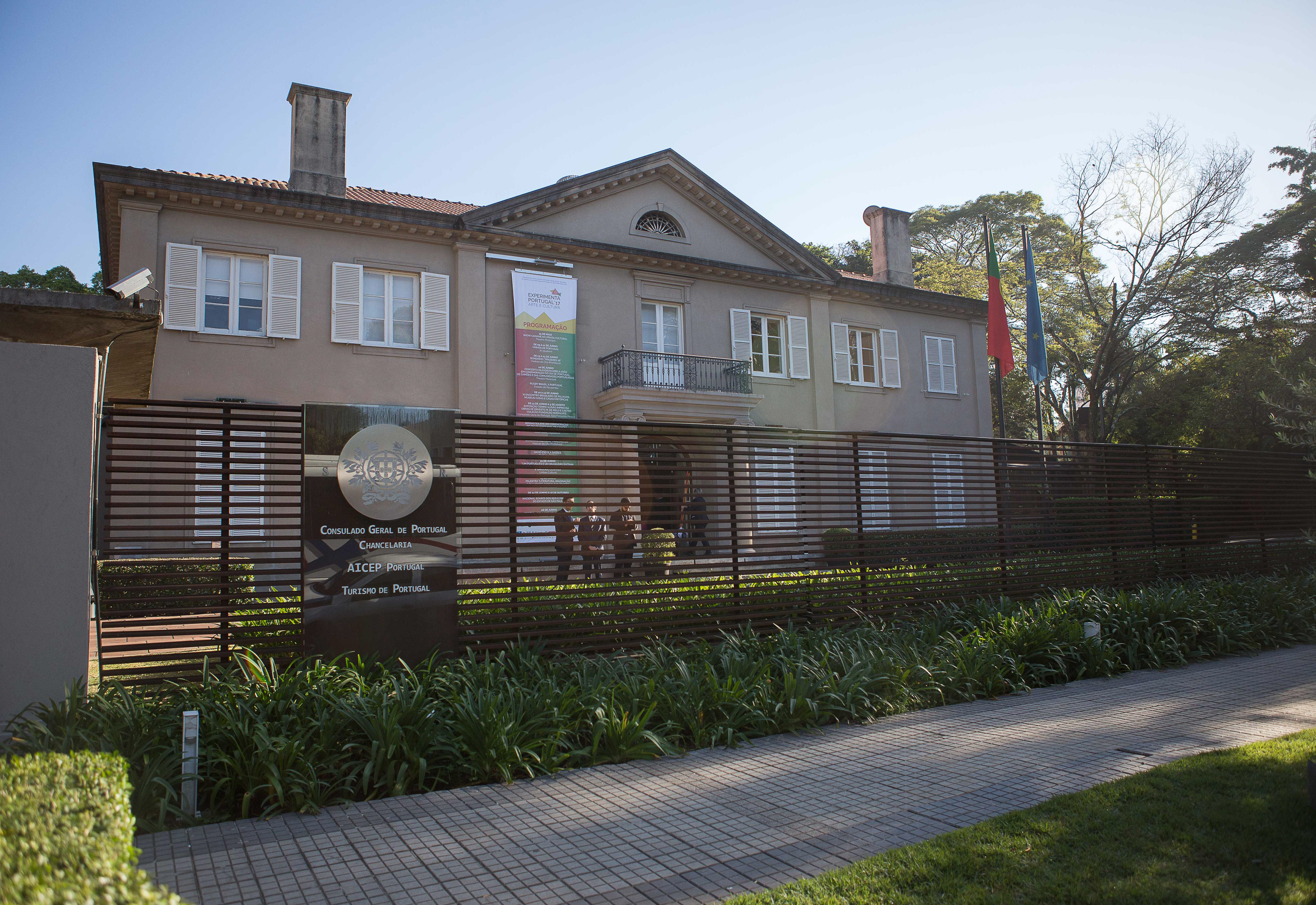
Consulate-General of Portugal in São Paulo

== See also ==
- Brazilian Portuguese
- Portuguese Brazilians
- Brazilians in Portugal
- Equality Statute between Brazil and Portugal
- Brazil–European Union relations
- List of ambassadors of Portugal to Brazil
