= CPF number =

Brazilian taxpayer register

CPF
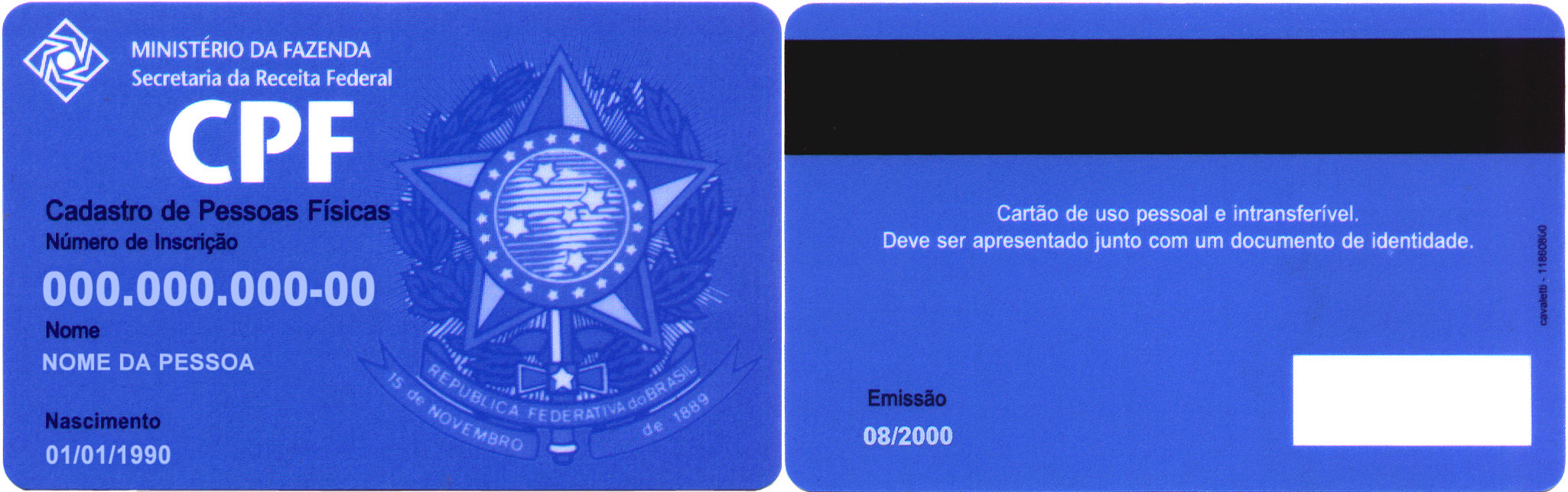
- Example of a CPF card (pre-2011 version)
- Subject: Natural persons
- Full name: Cadastro de Pessoas Físicas
- Organization: Federal Revenue of Brazil
- Introduced: 29 November 1965; 60 years ago
- No. of digits: 11

The CPF number (Brazilian Portuguese: [ˌsepeˈɛfi]; short for Cadastro de Pessoas Físicas, 'Physical Persons Register') is the Brazilian individual taxpayer register since its creation in 1965. A CPF number is individually assigned by the Brazilian Federal Revenue to each physical person, whether Brazilian or resident alien who, directly or indirectly, pays taxes in Brazil. It is an 11‑digit number in the format xxx.xxx.xxx-xx, where the last 2 numbers are check digits, generated through an arithmetic operation on the first nine digits.

By May 2020, a digital version of the document was available for Android and iOS with the app CPF Digital.

In June 2020, during the COVID-19 pandemic, an audit made by the Tribunal de Contas da União (Portuguese for 'Federal Court of Accounts'; TCU) revealed that there were at least 12.5 million more CPFs (Note: active entries, that is) than the total population. Auditors revealed that in 3.3 million valid entries there was evidence that the individual was already dead. The 2020 audit found more than 78,000 active CPFs of people over 110 years old, while international surveys report that there were only 29 people in this age group in the world by then.

During the COVID-19 pandemic, all requests for CPF from new foreign residents were taken virtually.

Now, foreign residents can request a CPF only in person at a Brazilian embassy or consulate, depending on availability. Applicants can consult the Brazilian Ministry of Foreign Affairs website to find the nearest diplomatic mission abroad and verify its jurisdiction and working hours.>

Beginning from the state of Santa Catarina in November 2021, the Federal government started implementing a unified register paradigm, whereby the Brazilian identity number is merged into the CPF. By late 2024, the federal government had begun issuing identity cards with the CPF number as the unique identifier in all states—the Carteira de Identidade Nacional (Portuguese for 'National Identity Card'), to which the transition should be completed by 2032. One major purpose of this change is to reduce fraud.

== Uses of CPF ==
The CPF is utilized in a variety of legal, financial, and administrative situations in Brazil. Because of these uses, registration is mandatory for individuals who:

- Reside in Brazil and are part of the passive pole of the main or ancillary tax relationship, whether as a taxpayer or responsible person, as well as the respective legal representatives;
- Carry out real estate operations of any kind in Brazil;
- Have, in Brazil, bank, savings or investment accounts, or operate in the financial or capital market in the country;
- Operate in the financial or capital market in Brazil, including stock, commodities, futures and similar exchanges;
- Possess, in Brazil, assets and rights subject to public registration or specific registration, including real estate, vehicles, vessels, aircraft, financial instruments and equity interests or in the capital market;
- Are declared as dependents in the IRPF Declaration (Personal Income Tax);
- Are required by agencies or entities of the federal, state, district or municipal public administration, under the terms of its own legislation, affecting the business of these agencies and entities;
- Had their birth registered in a Brazilian civil registry office after the execution of the agreement between the Brazilian Federal Revenue Service and the Brazilian Association of Registrars of Natural Persons (ARPEN); or
- Have applied for benefits of any kind in the INSS (National Institute of Social Security).

Additionally, non-Brazilians and non-residents can also obtain a CPF, and they are required to do so if they engage in any of the mandatory activities listed above. Beyond formal legal, tax, or real estate obligations, acquiring the document is often a mandatory practical step for immigrants and international students. CPF is also require to access some consumer services in Brazil, such as opening accounts with traditional banks and fintechs, creating a Pix key for instant payments, and registering for local transportation and food delivery applications like 99 and iFood.

== As a general-purpose identification number ==
On 11 January 2023, a federal law has been enacted in Brazil to consider the CPF number "unique and sufficient" to identify citizens on government databases. The law also requires the CPF number to appear on databases and documents of government entities, the civil registry of natural persons and professional councils, especially the following documents:

- Birth, marriage and death certificates;
- National Identity Document (Documento Nacional de Identidade or DNI);
- Worker Identification Number (Número de Identificação do Trabalhador or NIT);
- Registration with the Social Integration Program (Programa de Integração Social or PIS) or the Public Servant Patrimony Formation Program (Programa de Formação de Patrimônio do Servidor Público or PASEP)
- National Health Card (Cartão Nacional de Saúde);
- voter registration;
- work cards;
- driver's license numbers;
- military certificates;
- professional identity cards issued by fiscalization councils of regulated professions, and;
- other registration certificates and registration numbers on government databases.

The law also specifies that all new identity documents issued or re-issued by government entities or professional councils must use the CPF number as the identification number. The law is effective as soon as it is published, and government entities have 12 months from the publication of the law to adopt the CPF number as the identification number on their systems and procedures, and 24 months for entities to accomplish interoperability between databases through the CPF number.

== Characteristics ==
Fiscal Regions of Brazil

A CPF number is a 11-digit number of which the first eight digits form its base. The ninth number indicates the Fiscal Region responsible for its registration. The Fiscal Regions have the following identification:

- 1 – DF, GO, MS, MT and TO;
- 2 – AC, AM, AP, PA, RO and RR;
- 3 – CE, MA and PI;
- 4 – AL, PB, PE and RN;
- 5 – BA and SE;
- 6 – MG;
- 7 – ES and RJ;
- 8 – SP;
- 9 – PR and SC;
- 0 – RS. (Note: In regards of the tenth Fiscal Region, the number zero is used as the ninth digit.)

Finally, the last two digits are the verifying digits, mathematically calculated.

== See also ==
- CNPJ – National Registry of Legal Entities
- National identification number § Brazil
- Brazilian identity card
- Similar individual registers elsewhere:
  - Social Security number (United States)
  - National Insurance number (United Kingdom)
  - SNILS (Russia)
  - Social insurance number (Canada)
  - INSEE code (France)
  - Personal Public Service Number (Ireland)
  - Tax file number (Australia)
  - Aadhaar (India)
