= Visa requirements for Brazilian citizens =

Administrative entry restrictions

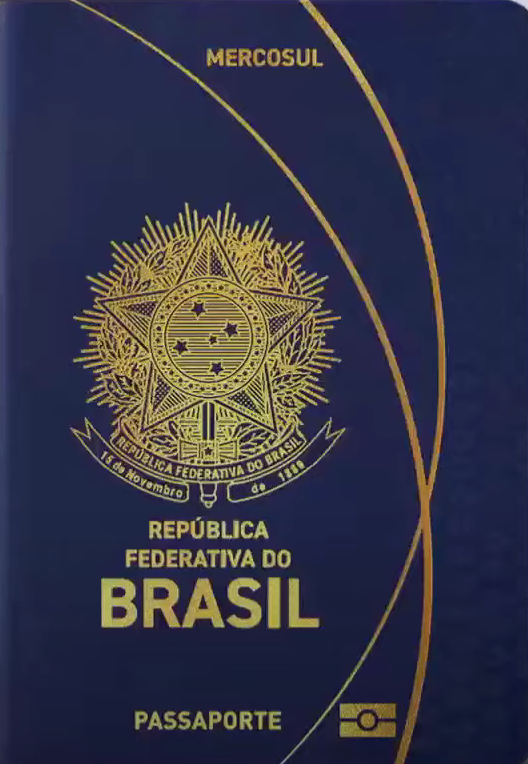
A Brazilian Passport

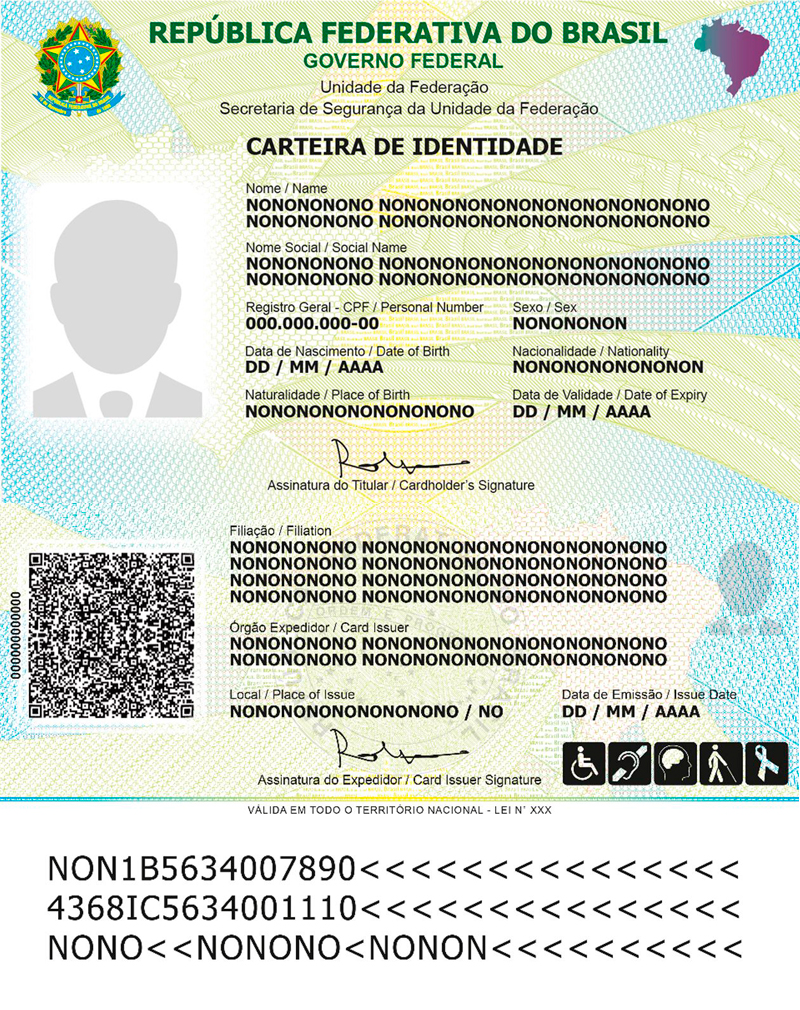
A Brazilian Identity Card issued by Identification Institutes from Federative Units with less than ten years from date of issue and as long as it corresponds to the bearer's biometric status is considered valid as a travel document for almost all South American countries.

Visa requirements for Brazilian citizens are administrative entry restrictions by the authorities of other states placed on citizens of Brazil.

As of 2026, Brazilian citizens have visa-free or visa on arrival access to 170 countries and territories, ranking the Brazilian passport 15th in the world according to the Henley Passport Index.

== Visa requirements map ==
Visa requirements for Brazilian citizens holding ordinary passports Brazil Freedom of movement / ID card valid Visa not required / ETA (Note: ETA required for Israel, Kenya, New Zealand, Saint Kitts and Nevis, Seychelles, South Korea and the United Kingdom.) Visa on arrival eVisa Visa available both on arrival or online Visa required

== Visa requirements ==
The Mercosur member states of Argentina, Bolívia, Brazil, Paraguay, and Uruguay, together with most other South American countries (as shown below) do not even require a Brazilian passport; a national or state-issued Brazilian identity card is enough for entry into all Mercosur member and associate states (with the exception of Guyana and Suriname).

Nevertheless, the identity card must be in good condition, must not have expired, and the holder must be clearly recognizable in the photograph.

Brazilians within Mercosur have unlimited access to any of the full members (Argentina, Bolívia, Paraguay, Uruguay) and associated members (Chile, Peru, Colombia, Ecuador) with the right to residence and work, with no requirement other than nationality.

Citizens of these nine countries (including Brazil) may apply for the grant of "temporary residence" for up to two years in another country of the bloc. Then, they may apply for "permanent residence" just before the term of their "temporary residence" expires.

Brazilians may request lawful permanent resident status in Argentina and Uruguay at any time. No prior temporary resident status is needed.

Country	Visa requirement	Allowed stay	Notes (excluding departure fees)	Reciprocity
Afghanistan	eVisa	30 days	e-Visa : Visitors must arrive at Kabul International (KBL).	✓
Albania	Visa not required	90 days		✓
Algeria	Visa required		Persons may be denied entry if entering with a passport containing visas or stamps issued by Israel.; Visitors on tours organized to some southern regions by an approved travel agency may obtain a visa on arrival for up to 30 days.	✓
Andorra	Visa not required	90 days		✓
Angola	Visa not required	30 days	30 days per trip, but no more than 90 days within any 1 calendar year for tourism purposes only.; Visitors must have a return/onward ticket and a hotel reservation confirmation.; An International Certificate of Vaccination is required.	X
Antigua and Barbuda	Visa not required	6 months		✓
Argentina	Freedom of Movement		Entry is allowed with a valid ID card that is less than 10 years old. Puerto Iguazú land border post also allows tourists with driving license who will stay less than 24 hours, but ID card is required to enter other cities.; Brazilians can live and work legally in Argentina under the Mercosur (and Associated Countries) immigration agreement with no requirement other than being a citizen at birth or a naturalized citizen for over 5 years, and passing a background check.; Brazilians may request lawful permanent resident status in Argentina at any time.	✓
Armenia	Visa not required	180 days		✓
Australia	Online visa required		May apply online (Online Visitor e600 visa).; Work and holiday visa	✓
Austria	Visa not required	90 days	90 days within any 180-day period in the Schengen Area	✓
Azerbaijan	eVisa	30 days		X
Bahamas	Visa not required	3 months		✓
Bahrain	eVisa / Visa on arrival	14 days		X
Bangladesh	Visa required			✓
Barbados	Visa not required	6 months		✓
Belarus	Visa not required	90 days	90 days within any 1-year period.	✓
Belgium	Visa not required	90 days	90 days within any 180-day period in the Schengen Area	✓
Belize	Visa not required	90 days		✓
Benin	eVisa	30 days	Must have an international vaccination certificate.; Three types of electronic visa are offered: the e-Visa valid for 30 days for a single entry (50 EUR), the e-Visa valid for 30 days for several (multiple) entries (75 EUR), and the e-Visa valid for 90 days to make several (multiple) entries (100 EUR).	X
Bhutan	eVisa	90 days	The Sustainable Development Fee (SDF) of 200 USD per person, per night for almost all visitors to Bhutan. Additionally, if payment is made in US dollars from September 1, 2023 to August 31, 2027, the SDF is 100 USD.	X
Bolivia	Freedom of Movement		Entry is allowed with a valid ID card that is less than 10 years old.; Brazilians can live and work legally in Bolivia under the Mercosur (and Associated Countries) immigration agreement with no requirement other than being a citizen at birth or a naturalized citizen for over 5 years, and passing a background check.	✓
Bosnia and Herzegovina	Visa not required	90 days	90 days within any 6-month period.	✓
Botswana	Visa not required	90 days		X
Brunei	Visa required			✓
Bulgaria	Visa not required	90 days	90 days within any 180-day period in the Schengen Area	✓
Burkina Faso	eVisa			X
Burundi	Online Visa / Visa on arrival	1 month		X
Cambodia	eVisa / Visa on arrival	30 days	Visa is also obtainable online.	X
Cameroon	eVisa			X
Canada	Visa required		Brazilian citizens who have held a Canadian visa in the last 10 years or who hold a valid United States non-immigrant visa can enter Canada solely with an eTA when arriving by air.	✓
Cape Verde	Visa not required	30 days	Must register online at least 5-day prior to arrival.; Must register online at least five days prior to arrival.; Visitors must pay the Airport Security Fee (TSA) before visiting. The cost is 3,400 CVE (approx. 31 EUR) and can be paid via the online platform (EASE).	X
Central African Republic	Visa required			✓
Chad	eVisa			X
Chile	Freedom of Movement		Entry is allowed with a valid ID card that is less than 10 years old.; Brazilians can live and work legally in Chile under the Mercosur (and Associated Countries) immigration agreement with no requirement other than being a citizen at birth or a naturalized citizen for over 5 years, and passing a background check.	✓
China	Visa not required	30 days	Visa-free from June 1, 2025, until December 31, 2026.; 240-hour (10-day) visa-free transit to a third country or region (including Hong Kong, Macau or Taiwan) using any mode of transport. Must have a confirmed onward ticket/itinerary, and enter through 1 of 64 approved ports.; During which, may freely travel within the 24 provinces permitted for visa-free transit and engage in tourism, business, and visits.; 24-hour visa-free transit to a third country or region (including Hong Kong, Macau, and Taiwan), is available at most international airports, without leaving the airport.; Travellers who need to leave the airport may obtain a temporary entry permit from immigration.; 5-day port visa (Visa on Arrival) for Shenzhen if arriving at designated ports of entry from Hong Kong by land or sea, for stays within Shenzhen.; 3-day port visa (Visa on Arrival) if arriving in Zhuhai or Xiamen at designated ports of entry, for stays within the respective city.; 15-day visa-free entry for cruise ship passengers in tour groups, if arriving at any cruise port along China's coastline, including but not limited to Tianjin; Dalian; Shanghai; Lianyungang; Wenzhou; Zhoushan; Xiamen; Qingdao; Guangzhou; Shenzhen; Beihai; Haikou; Sanya. May further travel inland to all regions of coastal provinces (and equivalents) and Beijing.; May apply for a port visa (Visa on Arrival) if travelling for an urgent, qualified reason. Prior clearance for port visa is highly recommended or may be denied boarding by airlines.	X
Colombia	Freedom of Movement		Entry is allowed with a valid ID card that is less than 10 years old.; Brazilians can live and work legally in Colombia under the Mercosur (and Associated Countries) immigration agreement with no requirement other than being a citizen at birth or a naturalized citizen for over 5 years, and passing a background check.	✓
Comoros	Visa on arrival	45 days		X
Republic of the Congo	Visa required			✓
Democratic Republic of the Congo	eVisa	7 days		X
Costa Rica	Visa not required	90 days		✓
Côte d'Ivoire	eVisa	3 months	e-Visa holders must arrive via Port Bouet Airport.	X
Croatia	Visa not required	90 days	90 days within any 180-day period in the Schengen Area	✓
Cuba	eVisa	90 days		✓
Cyprus	Visa not required	90 days	90 days within any 180 day period.	✓
Czech Republic	Visa not required	90 days	90 days within any 180-day period in the Schengen Area	✓
Denmark	Visa not required	90 days	90 days within any 180-day period in the Schengen Area	✓
Djibouti	eVisa	90 days		X
Dominica	Visa not required	3 months		✓
Dominican Republic	Visa not required	90 days		✓
Ecuador	Freedom of Movement		Entry is allowed with a valid ID card that is less than 10 years old.; Brazilians can live and work legally in Ecuador under the Mercosur (and Associated Countries) immigration agreement with no requirement other than being a citizen at birth or a naturalized citizen for over 5 years, and passing a background check.	✓
Egypt	eVisa/Visa on arrival	30 days		X
El Salvador	Visa not required	3 months		✓
Equatorial Guinea	eVisa			✓
Eritrea	Visa required			✓
Estonia	Visa not required	90 days	90 days within any 180-day period in the Schengen Area	✓
Eswatini	Visa not required	30 days		X
Ethiopia	eVisa / Visa on arrival	up to 90 days	Visa on arrival is obtainable only at Addis Ababa Bole International Airport.; e-Visa holders must arrive via Addis Ababa Bole International Airport.; e-Visa is available for 30 or 90 days.	X
Fiji	Visa not required	4 months		✓
Finland	Visa not required	90 days	90 days within any 180-day period in the Schengen Area	✓
France	Visa not required	90 days	90 days within any 180-day period in the Schengen Area; 30 days within any 180-day period in French Guiana, until 31 January 2027; 90 days within any 180-day period or 3 months within any 6-month period in other parts of Overseas France	✓
Gabon	eVisa	90 days	e-Visa holders must arrive via Libreville International Airport.	X
Gambia	Visa required		An entry clearance must be obtained from the Gambian Immigration prior to travel.; As of April 2023, a visa can be obtained at the border with Senegal for US$100. Valid for three months and multiple entries.	X
Georgia	Visa not required	1 year		✓
Germany	Visa not required	90 days	90 days within any 180-day period in the Schengen Area	✓
Ghana	eVisa			X
Greece	Visa not required	90 days	90 days within any 180-day period in the Schengen Area	✓
Grenada	Visa not required	3 months		✓
Guatemala	Visa not required	90 days		✓
Guinea	eVisa	90 days		X
Guinea-Bissau	Visa on arrival	90 days		X
Guyana	Visa not required	3 months	Brief visits just to the border town of Lethem are possible with a valid Brazilian ID card	✓
Haiti	Visa not required	3 months		X
Honduras	Visa not required	3 months		✓
Hungary	Visa not required	90 days	90 days within any 180-day period in the Schengen Area	✓
Iceland	Visa not required	90 days	90 days within any 180-day period in the Schengen Area	✓
India	eVisa	30 days	e-Visa holders must arrive via 32 designated airports (Note: Ahmedabad; Amritsar; Bagdogra; Bengaluru; Bhubaneswar; Chandigarh; Chennai; Coimbatore; Delhi; Gaya; Goa-Dabolim; Goa-Manohar; Guwahati; Hyderabad; Indore; Jaipur; Kannur; Kochi; Kolkata; Kozhikode; Lucknow; Madurai; Mangaluru; Mumbai; Nagpur; Port Blair; Pune; Surat; Thiruvananthapuram; Tiruchirappalli; Varanasi; Visakhapatnam) or 5 designated seaports. (Note: Chennai; Cochin; Mormugao (Goa); Mumbai; Mangalore); An Indian e-Tourist Visa may only be obtained twice within 1 calendar year.; Foreigners of Pakistani origin or who hold a Pakistani Passport are not eligible for an e-Visa. Foreigners who are not Pakistani nationals, but whose parents or grandparents (either paternal or maternal) were born in, or were permanent residents in Pakistan, are also not eligible for an e-Visa.	X
Indonesia	Visa not required / e-VOA	30 days		✓
Iran	Visa not required	15 days		X
Iraq	eVisa	30 days		X
Ireland	Visa not required	90 days		✓
Israel	Electronic Travel Authorization	90 days		✓
Italy	Visa not required	90 days	90 days within any 180-day period in the Schengen Area	✓
Jamaica	Visa not required	6 months	90 days (business), 6 months (tourist).	✓
Japan	Visa not required	90 days	Visa not required for visits up to 90 days using the Brazilian biometric passports according of Here	✓
Jordan	eVisa / Visa on arrival		Visa can be obtained upon arrival, it will cost a total of 40 JOD, obtainable at most international ports of entry and land border crossings. (except King Hussein/Allenby Bridge)	X
Kazakhstan	Visa not required	30 days	30 days within any 1-year period.	✓
Kenya	Electronic Travel Authorisation	90 days	Applications can be submitted up to 90 days prior to travel and must be submitted at least 3 days in advance.; eTA fee is 32.50 USD.; Proof of reservation at the hotel where visitors plan to stay is required (if staying with friends, an invitation letter is also acceptable).; Yellow fever vaccination certificate is required if coming from endemic countries.	X
Kiribati	Visa not required	90 days	90 days within any 12-month period.	✓
North Korea	Visa required			✓
South Korea	Electronic Travel Authorization	90 days	The validity period of a K-ETA is 3 years from the date of approval.	✓
Kuwait	Visa required			✓
Kyrgyzstan	Visa not required	30 days	30 days within any 60-day period.	X
Laos	eVisa / Visa on arrival	30 days	18 (Note: Savannakhet Airport; Lanetoui - Mengkang (China); Meuangmom - Wan Pong (Myanmar); Banvang - Ban Khok Phai (Thailand); Namngeun - Huay Kon (Thailand); Paksan - Bueng Kan (Thailand); Paktaphan - Pak Saeng (Thailand); Pangmon - Ban Huak (Thailand); Phoudou (Thailand); Dak ta ock - Nam Giang (Vietnam); La Lai (Vietnam); Namkan (Vietnam); Namphao - Cau Treo (Vietnam); Namsoy - Na Meo (Vietnam); Naphao - Cha Lo (Vietnam); Pahang - Long Sap (Vietnam); Panghok - Tây Trang (Vietnam); Phoukeua - Bo Y (Vietnam)) of the 33 border crossings are only open to regular visa holders.; e-Visa may be used to enter Laos through the Luang Prabang, Pakse and Vientiane international airports, 3 Thai-Lao Friendship Bridges (Note: Vientiane (Friendship Bridge 1); Savannakhet (Friendship Bridge 2); Bokeo (Friendship Bridge 4)), in Boten (road and railroad), and in Vientiane (at Khamsavath railway station).; Visa on arrival is available at the Luang Prabang, Pakse and Vientiane international airports, 4 Thai-Lao Friendship Bridges (Note: Vientiane (Friendship Bridge 1); Savannakhet (Friendship Bridge 2); Khammouane (Friendship Bridge 3); Bokeo (Friendship Bridge 4)) and 7 border crossings. (Note: Nongnokkheane - Trapeang Kriel (Cambodia); Boten - Bo han (China); Golden Triangle/Samliemkham (Thailand); Khamsavath railway station (Thailand); Namheuang - Ban Na Kraseng (Thailand); Vang tao - Chongmek (Thailand); Dansavan - Lao Bảo (Vietnam))	X
Latvia	Visa not required	90 days	90 days within any 180-day period in the Schengen Area	✓
Lebanon	Free visa on arrival	1 month	Brazilian immigrants, or Brazilian businessmen are granted a multiple entry visa on arrival valid for 90 days for tourism purposes only and is renewable once following the approval of the General Directorate of General Security. This visa however shall not exceed 90 days.	X
Lesotho	eVisa			X
Liberia	e-VOA	3 months		✓
Libya	eVisa			X
Liechtenstein	Visa not required	90 days	90 days within any 180-day period in the Schengen Area	✓
Lithuania	Visa not required	90 days	90 days within any 180-day period in the Schengen Area	✓
Luxembourg	Visa not required	90 days	90 days within any 180-day period in the Schengen Area	✓
Madagascar	eVisa / Visa on arrival	90 days	For stays of 61 to 90 days, the visa fee is US$59.	X
Malawi	eVisa / Visa on arrival	90 days		X
Malaysia	Visa not required	3 months		✓
Maldives	Free visa on arrival	30 days		X
Mali	Visa required			✓
Malta	Visa not required	90 days	90 days within any 180-day period in the Schengen Area	✓
Marshall Islands	Visa on arrival	90 days		X
Mauritania	eVisa	30 days	Available at Nouakchott–Oumtounsy International Airport.	X
Mauritius	Visa not required	90 days		X
Mexico	eVisa	180 days	Valid for tourism, business trips, and also for passengers in transit through Mexican airports, without authorization for paid activities.; The document is valid for a single entry only.	X
Micronesia	Visa not required	30 days		X
Moldova	Visa not required	90 days	90 days within any 180 day period.	X
Monaco	Visa not required			✓
Mongolia	Visa not required	90 days	90 days within any 180 day period.	✓
Montenegro	Visa not required	90 days		✓
Morocco	Visa not required	3 months		✓
Mozambique	eVisa / Visa on arrival	30 days		X
Myanmar	eVisa	28 days	e-Visa holders must arrive via Yangon, Nay Pyi Taw or Mandalay airports or via land border crossings with Thailand — Tachileik, Myawaddy and Kawthaung or India — Rih Khaw Dar and Tamu.; e-Visa available for both tourism or business purposes.	X
Namibia	Visa not required	3 months		✓
Nauru	Visa required			✓
Nepal	Online Visa / Visa on arrival	90 days		X
Netherlands	Visa not required	90 days	90 days within any 180-day period in the Schengen Area	✓
New Zealand	Electronic Travel Authority	3 months	International Visitor Conservation and Tourism Levy must be paid upon requesting an Electronic Travel Authority.; Holders of an Australian Permanent Resident Visa or Resident Return Visa may be granted a New Zealand Resident Visa on arrival permitting indefinite stay (pursuant to the Trans-Tasman Travel Arrangement), subject to meeting character requirements and obtaining an Electronic Travel Authority prior to departure. Such travellers are not required to pay the International Visitor Conservation and Tourism Levy.	✓
Nicaragua	Visa not required	90 days		✓
Niger	Visa required			✓
Nigeria	eVisa	30 days		✓
North Macedonia	Visa not required	90 days		✓
Norway	Visa not required	90 days	90 days within any 180-day period in the Schengen Area	✓
Oman	Visa not required / eVisa	14 days / 30 days		X
Pakistan	eVisa	3 months		X
Palau	Free visa on arrival	30 days		X
Panama	Visa not required	90 days		✓
Papua New Guinea	eVisa	60 days	Available at Gurney Airport (Alotau), Mount Hagen Airport, Port Moresby Airport and Tokua Airport (Rabaul).	X
Paraguay	Freedom of Movement		Entry is allowed with a valid ID card that is less than 10 years old.; Brazilians can live and work legally in Paraguay under the Mercosur (and Associated Countries) immigration agreement with no requirement other than being a citizen at birth or a naturalized citizen for over 5 years, and passing a background check.	✓
Peru	Freedom of Movement		Entry is allowed with a valid ID card that is less than 10 years old.; Brazilians can live and work legally in Peru under the Mercosur (and Associated Countries) immigration agreement with no requirement other than being a citizen at birth or a naturalized citizen for over 5 years, and passing a background check.	✓
Philippines	Visa not required	59 days		✓
Poland	Visa not required	90 days	90 days within any 180-day period in the Schengen Area	✓
Portugal	Visa not required	90 days	90 days within any 180-day period in the Schengen Area	✓
Qatar	Visa not required	90 days		✓
Romania	Visa not required	90 days	90 days within any 180-day period in the Schengen Area	✓
Russia	Visa not required	90 days	90 days within any 180 day period.	✓
Rwanda	eVisa / Visa on arrival	30 days		X
Saint Kitts and Nevis	Electronic Travel Authorisation	3 months		✓
Saint Lucia	Visa not required	6 weeks		X
Saint Vincent and the Grenadines	Visa not required	90 days		✓
Samoa	Entry permit on arrival	90 days		X
San Marino	Visa not required			✓
São Tomé and Príncipe	Visa not required	15 days		X
Saudi Arabia	Visa required			✓
Senegal	Visa not required	90 days		X
Serbia	Visa not required	90 days		✓
Seychelles	Visa not required	90 days		✓
Sierra Leone	eVisa / Visa on arrival	30 days		X
Singapore	Visa not required	30 days		✓
Slovakia	Visa not required	90 days	90 days within any 180-day period in the Schengen Area	✓
Slovenia	Visa not required	90 days	90 days within any 180-day period in the Schengen Area	✓
Solomon Islands	Free Visitor's permit on arrival	3 months		X
Somalia	eVisa	30 days		X
South Africa	Visa not required	90 days		✓
South Sudan	eVisa		Obtainable online 30 days single entry for 100 USD, 90 days multiple entry for 200 USD and 180 days multiple entry for 350 USD.; Printed visa authorization must be presented at the time of travel.	X
Spain	Visa not required	90 days	90 days within any 180-day period in the Schengen Area	✓
Sri Lanka	ETA / Visa on arrival	30 days		X
Sudan	Visa required			✓
Suriname	Visa not required	90 days	An entrance fee of USD 50 or EUR 50 must be paid online prior to arrival.; Multiple entry e-Visa is also available.	✓
Sweden	Visa not required	90 days	90 days within any 180-day period in the Schengen Area	✓
Switzerland	Visa not required	90 days	90 days within any 180-day period in the Schengen Area	✓
Syria	eVisa			X
Tajikistan	Visa not required / eVisa	30 days / 60 days	Visa also available online.; e-Visa holders can enter through all border points.	X
Tanzania	eVisa / Visa on arrival	90 days		X
Thailand	Visa not required	3 months		✓
Timor-Leste	Visa on arrival	30 days		X
Togo	eVisa	15 days		X
Tonga	Visa on arrival	31 days		X
Trinidad and Tobago	Visa not required	90 days		✓
Tunisia	Visa not required	3 months		✓
Turkey	Visa not required	90 days		✓
Turkmenistan	Visa required		10-day visa on arrival if holding a letter of invitation provided by a company registered in Turkmenistan with a prior approval from the Foreign Ministry. Visitors can apply to extend their stay for an additional 10 days.; When transiting between two non-bordering countries, visitors can obtain a Turkmenistan transit visa for a five-day stay. This must be applied for in advance at the Turkmenistan Embassy. Visitors must also submit copies of the visas for the country of entry into Turkmenistan and the country of departure from Turkmenistan. Visa fee is 20 USD.	✓
Tuvalu	Visa on arrival	1 month		X
Uganda	eVisa	3 months	Determined at the port of entry.	X
Ukraine	Visa not required	90 days		✓
United Arab Emirates	Visa not required	90 days	90 days within any 12-month period.	✓
United Kingdom and Crown dependencies	Electronic Travel Authorisation	6 months		✓
United States	Visa required		Tourist visas are issued with validity of up to 10 years.	✓
Uruguay	Freedom of Movement		Entry is allowed with a valid ID card that is less than 10 years old.; Brazilians can live and work legally in Uruguay under the Mercosur (and Associated Countries) immigration agreement with no requirement other than being a citizen at birth or a naturalized citizen for over 5 years, and passing a background check.; Brazilians may request lawful permanent resident status in Uruguay at any time.	✓
Uzbekistan	Visa not required	30 days		X
Vanuatu	Visa not required	120 days		X
Vatican City	Visa not required			✓
Venezuela	Visa not required	90 days		✓
Vietnam	eVisa	90 days	30 days visa free when visit Phu Quoc Island.	X
Yemen	Visa required		Yemen introduced an e-Visa system for visitors who meet certain eligibility requirements (group travel of 10 or more people, business trips, and transit etc.).	✓
Zambia	eVisa / Visa on arrival	90 days	For those travelling to Zambia for business, the maximum stay is 30 days in any 1-year period.; Tourists are allowed 90 days in any 1-year period.; For tourism purposes also eligible for a universal visa allowing access to Zimbabwe.	X
Zimbabwe	eVisa / Visa on arrival	1 month	For tourism purposes also eligible for a universal visa allowing access to Zambia.	X

== Dependent, disputed, or restricted territories ==
=== Unrecognized or partially recognized countries ===
Territory	Conditions of access	Notes
Abkhazia	Visa required	Tourists from all countries (except Georgia) can visit Abkhazia for a period not exceeding 24 hours as part of an organized tourist group.
Kosovo	Visa not required	90 days
Northern Cyprus	Visa not required	90 days
Palestine	Visa not required	Arrival by sea to Gaza Strip not allowed.
Sahrawi Arab Democratic Republic	Visa regime undefined	Undefined visa regime in the Western Sahara controlled territory.
Somaliland	Visa on arrival	30 days for 30 USD, payable on arrival.
South Ossetia	Visa required	To enter South Ossetia, visitors must have a multiple-entry visa for Russia and register their stay with the Migration Service of the Ministry of Internal Affairs within 3 days.
Taiwan	Visa required	
Transnistria	Visa not required	Registration required after 24h.

=== Dependent and autonomous territories ===
Territory	Conditions of access	Notes
China
Hong Kong	Visa not required	90 days
Macau	Visa not required	90 days
Denmark
Faroe Islands	Visa not required	
Greenland	Visa not required	
France
Clipperton Island	Special permit required	
French Guiana	Visa not required	30 days within any 180-day period, until 31 January 2027; up to 15 days for trips organized by an approved travel agency; up to 3 days when in transit to France (including other French territories) or to Brazil; residents of Oiapoque holding of a cross-border card, only for visits to Saint-Georges for up to 72 hours; members of emergency services.
French Polynesia	Visa not required	3 months within any 6-month period
Guadeloupe	Visa not required	90 days within any 180-day period
Martinique	Visa not required	90 days within any 180-day period
Saint Barthélemy	Visa not required	90 days within any 180-day period
Saint Martin	Visa not required	90 days within any 180-day period
Mayotte	Visa not required	90 days within any 180-day period
New Caledonia	Visa not required	3 months within any 6-month period
Réunion	Visa not required	90 days within any 180-day period
Saint Pierre and Miquelon	Visa not required	90 days within any 180-day period
Wallis and Futuna	Visa not required	3 months within any 6-month period
Netherlands
Aruba	Visa not required	30 days, extendable to 180 days.
Bonaire	Visa not required	3 months
Sint Eustatius	Visa not required	3 months
Saba	Visa not required	3 months
Curaçao	Visa not required	
Sint Maarten	Visa not required	
New Zealand
Cook Islands	Visa not required	31 days
Niue	Visa not required	30 days
Tokelau	Permit required	
Norway
(Norway) Jan Mayen	Permit required	Permit issued by the local police required for staying for less than 24 hours and permit issued by the Norwegian police for staying for more than 24 hours.
(Norway) Svalbard	Visa not required	Unlimited period under Svalbard Treaty.
United Kingdom
Akrotiri and Dhekelia	Visa not required	
Anguilla	Visa not required	3 months
Bermuda	Visa not required	Up to 6 months, decided on arrival.
British Indian Ocean Territory	Special permit required	
British Virgin Islands	Visa not required	30 days, extensions possible.
Cayman Islands	Visa not required	6 months
Falkland Islands	Visa not required	A visitor permit is normally issued as a stamp in the passport on arrival, The maximum validity period is 1 month.
Gibraltar	Visa not required	
Montserrat	Visa not required	6 months
Pitcairn Islands	Visa not required	14 days visa-free and landing fee 35 USD or tax of 5 USD if not going ashore.
Saint Helena	Visa not required	
Ascension Island	eVisa	3 months within any year period.
Tristan da Cunha	Permission required	Permission to land required for 15/30 pounds sterling (yacht/ship passenger) for Tristan da Cunha Island or 20 pounds sterling for Gough Island, Inaccessible Island or Nightingale Islands.
South Georgia and the South Sandwich Islands	Permit required	Pre-arrival permit from the Commissioner required (72 hours/1 month for 110/160 pounds sterling).
Turks and Caicos Islands	Visa not required	90 days
United States
American Samoa	Entry permit required	
Guam	Visa required	
Northern Mariana Islands	Visa required	
Puerto Rico	Visa required	
U.S. Virgin Islands	Visa required	
Antarctica and adjacent islands
Special permits required for Bouvet Island, British Antarctic Territory, French Southern and Antarctic Lands, Argentine Antarctica, (Australia) Australian Antarctic Territory, (Antártica Chilena Province) Chilean Antarctic Territory, (Australia) Heard Island and McDonald Islands, (Norway) Peter I Island, (Norway) Queen Maud Land, (New Zealand) Ross Dependency.

=== Other territories ===
- Australia. Ashmore and Cartier Islands - Special authorisation required.
- (Argentina) Isla Apipé and Isla del Medio - By being Argentine territories, the same visa policy applies.
- (Autonomous Republic of Crimea) Crimea. Visa not required. Territory accessed under Russian visa policy.
- China. Hainan - 30 days; Visa-free for Brazilian nationals.
- China. Tibet Autonomous Region - Tibet Travel Permit required (10 USD). = How to get Tibet Travel Permit, Successful Application Tips
- Colombia. San Andrés and Leticia - Visitors arriving at Gustavo Rojas Pinilla International Airport and Alfredo Vásquez Cobo International Airport must buy tourist cards on arrival.
- Ecuador. Galápagos - 60 days; Visitors must pre-register to receive a 20 USD Transit Control Card (TCT).
- Eritrea outside Asmara - To travel in the rest of the country, a Travel Permit for Foreigners is required (20 Eritrean nakfa).
- Fiji. Lau Province - Special permission required.
- (Greece) Mount Athos - Special permit required (4 days: 25 euro for Orthodox visitors, 35 euro for non-Orthodox visitors, 18 euro for students). There is a visitors' quota: maximum 100 Orthodox and 10 non-Orthodox per day and women are not allowed.
- India. Protected Area Permit (PAP) required for whole states of Nagaland and Sikkim and parts of states Manipur, Arunachal Pradesh, Uttaranchal, Jammu and Kashmir, Rajasthan, Himachal Pradesh. Restricted Area Permit (RAP) required for all of Andaman and Nicobar Islands and parts of Sikkim. Some of these requirements are occasionally lifted for a year.
- Iraqi Kurdistan - 30 days; Visitors may apply for an e-Visa.
- Iran. Kish Island - Visa not required.
- Kazakhstan. Closed cities - Special permission required for the town of Baikonur and surrounding areas in Kyzylorda Oblast, and the town of Gvardeyskiy near Almaty.
- North Korea outside Pyongyang - Special permit required. People are not allowed to leave the capital city, tourists can only leave the capital with a governmental tourist guide (no independent moving).
- Malaysia. Sabah and Sarawak - Visa not required. These states have their own immigration authorities and passport is required to travel to them, however the same visa applies.
- Russia. Special authorization required for several closed cities and regions in Russia require special authorization.
- (Saudi Arabia) Mecca and Medina - Special access required. Non-Muslims and those following the Ahmadiyya religious movement are strictly prohibited from entry.
- Sudan. Darfur - Separate travel permit is required.
- Sudan outside Khartoum - All foreigners traveling more than 25 kilometers outside of Khartoum must obtain a travel permit.
- Tajikistan. Gorno-Badakhshan Autonomous Province - OIVR permit required (15+5 Tajikistani Somoni) and another special permit (free of charge) is required for Lake Sarez.
- Turkmenistan. Closed cities - A special permit, issued prior to arrival by Ministry of Foreign Affairs, is required if visiting the following places: Atamurat, Cheleken, Dashoguz, Serakhs and Serhetabat.
- United States. United States Minor Outlying Islands - Special permits required for Baker Island, Howland Island, Jarvis Island, Johnston Atoll, Kingman Reef, Midway Atoll, Palmyra Atoll and Wake Island.
- Venezuela. Margarita Island - Visa not required. All visitors are fingerprinted.
- Vietnam. Phú Quốc - Visa not required for 30 days.
- Yemen outside Sanaa or Aden - Special permission needed for travel outside Sanaa or Aden.
- (United Nations) UN Buffer Zone in Cyprus - Access Permit is required for travelling inside the zone, except Civil Use Areas.
- (United Nations) Korean Demilitarized Zone - Restricted area.
- (United Nations) UNDOF Zone and Ghajar - Restricted area.

Visas for Cambodia, Myanmar, Rwanda, São Tomé and Príncipe, Senegal, Sri Lanka and Turkey are obtainable online.

== Non-visa restrictions ==
=== Blank passport pages ===
Many countries require a minimum number of blank pages to be available in the passport being presented, typically one or two pages. Endorsement pages, which often appear after the visa pages, are not counted as being valid or available.

=== Vaccination ===
Cover of the new International Certificate of Vaccination issued by the Bureau of Quarantine in the Philippines since 2021

The African countries of Angola, Benin, Burkina Faso, Burundi, Cameroon, Central African Republic, Democratic Republic of the Congo, Republic of the Congo, Côte d'Ivoire, Gabon, Ghana, Guinea-Bissau, Mali, Niger, Sierra Leone and Togo, South Sudan and Uganda, along with French Guiana in South America, require all incoming passengers older than nine months to one year, to have a current International Certificate of Vaccination or Prophylaxis.

Some other countries require vaccination only if the passenger is coming from an infected area or has visited one recently or has transited for 12 hours in those countries: Algeria, Botswana, Cabo Verde, Chad, Djibouti, Egypt, Eswatini, Ethiopia, Gambia, Ghana, Guinea, Lesotho, Libya, Equatorial Guinea, Eritrea, Madagascar, Malawi, Mauritania, Mauritius, Mozambique, Namibia, Nigeria, Papua New Guinea, Seychelles, Somalia, South Africa, Sudan, Tunisia, Uganda, Tanzania, Zambia and Zimbabwe.

=== Passport validity length ===
Very few countries, such as Paraguay, just require a valid passport on arrival.

However many countries and groupings now require only an identity card – especially from their neighbours. Other countries may have special bilateral arrangements that depart from the generality of their passport validity length policies to shorten the period of passport validity required for each other's citizens or even accept passports that have already expired (but not been cancelled).

Some countries, such as Japan, Ireland and the United Kingdom, require a passport valid throughout the period of the intended stay.

In the absence of specific bilateral agreements, countries requiring passports to be valid for at least 6 more months on arrival include Afghanistan, Algeria, Anguilla, Bahrain, Bhutan, Botswana, British Virgin Islands, Brunei, Cambodia, Cameroon, Cape Verde, Cayman Islands, Central African Republic, Chad, Comoros, Costa Rica, Côte d'Ivoire, Curaçao, Ecuador, Egypt, El Salvador, Equatorial Guinea, Fiji, Gabon, Guinea Bissau, Guyana, Haiti, India, Indonesia, Iran, Iraq, Israel, Jordan, Kenya, Kiribati, Kuwait, Laos, Madagascar, Malaysia, Marshall Islands, Mongolia, Myanmar, Namibia, Nepal, Nicaragua, Nigeria, Oman, Palau, Papua New Guinea, Peru, Philippines, Qatar, Rwanda, Samoa, Saudi Arabia, Singapore, Solomon Islands, Somalia, Sri Lanka, Sudan, Suriname, Tanzania, Thailand, Timor-Leste, Tokelau, Tonga, Turkey, Tuvalu, Uganda, United Arab Emirates, Vanuatu, Venezuela, and Vietnam.

Countries requiring passports valid for at least 4 months on arrival include Micronesia and Zambia.

Countries requiring passports with a validity of at least 3 months beyond the date of intended departure include Azerbaijan, Bosnia and Herzegovina, Honduras, Montenegro, Nauru, Moldova and New Zealand. Similarly, the EEA countries of Iceland, Liechtenstein, Norway, all European Union countries (except Ireland) together with Switzerland also require 3 months validity beyond the date of the bearer's intended departure unless the bearer is an EEA or Swiss national.

Countries requiring passports valid for at least 3 months on arrival include Albania, North Macedonia, Panama, and Senegal.

Bermuda requires passports to be valid for at least 45 days upon entry.

Countries that require a passport validity of at least one month beyond the date of intended departure include Eritrea, Hong Kong, Lebanon, Macau, the Maldives and South Africa.

==== Maximum passport age ====
Countries of the Schengen area require non-EU passports to be less than 10 years old upon entry.

=== Criminal record ===
Some countries, including Australia, Canada, Fiji, New Zealand and the United States, routinely deny entry to non-citizens who have a criminal record, while others impose restrictions depending on the type of conviction and the length of the sentence.

=== Persona non grata ===
The government of a country can declare a diplomat persona non grata, banning them from entering the country or expelling them if they have already entered. In non-diplomatic use, the authorities of a country may also declare a foreigner persona non grata permanently or temporarily, usually because of unlawful activity.

=== Israeli stamps ===
Kuwait, Lebanon, Libya, and Yemen do not allow entry to people with passport stamps from Israel or whose passports have either a used or an unused Israeli visa, or where there is evidence of previous travel to Israel such as entry or exit stamps from neighbouring border posts in transit countries such as Jordan and Egypt.

To circumvent this Arab League boycott of Israel, the Israeli immigration services have now mostly ceased to stamp foreign nationals' passports on either entry to or exit from Israel (unless the entry is for some work-related purposes). Since 15 January 2013, Israel no longer stamps foreign passports at Ben Gurion Airport. Passports are still (as of 22 June 2017) stamped at Erez when passing into and out of Gaza.

Iran refuses admission to holders of passports containing an Israeli visa or stamp that is less than 12 months old.

=== Biometrics ===
Several countries mandate that all travellers, or all foreign travellers, be fingerprinted on arrival and will refuse admission to or even arrest travellers who refuse to comply. In some countries, such as the United States, this may apply even to transit passengers who merely wish to change planes rather than go landside.

Fingerprinting countries/regions include Afghanistan, Argentina, Brunei, Cambodia, China, Ethiopia, Ghana, Guinea, India, Japan, Kenya (both fingerprints and a photo are taken), Malaysia upon entry and departure, Mongolia, Saudi Arabia, the Schengen Area, Singapore, South Korea, Taiwan, Thailand, Uganda, the United Arab Emirates and the United States.

Many countries also require a photo be taken of people entering the country. The United States, which does not fully implement exit control formalities at its land frontiers (although long mandated by its own legislation), intends to implement facial recognition for passengers departing from international airports to identify people who overstay their visa.

Together with fingerprint and face recognition, iris scanning is one of three biometric identification technologies internationally standardised since 2006 by the International Civil Aviation Organization (ICAO) for use in e-passports and the United Arab Emirates conducts iris scanning on visitors who need to apply for a visa. The United States Department of Homeland Security has announced plans to greatly increase the biometric data it collects at US borders. In 2018, Singapore began trials of iris scanning at three land and maritime immigration checkpoints.

== See also ==
- Brazilian identity card
- Brazilian nationality law
- Visa policy of Brazil
- Brazilian passport
