= Brazilian passport =

Passport issued to Brazilian nationals

Brazilian passport; Passaporte brasileiro
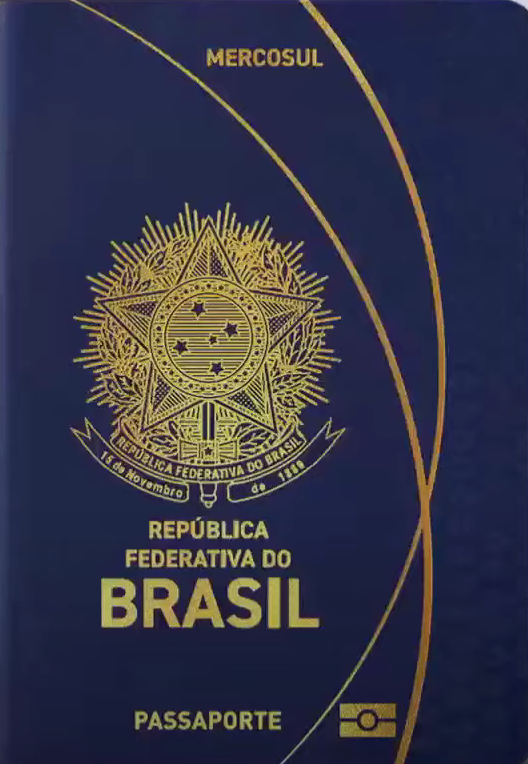
- Front cover of a contemporary Brazilian biometric passport introduced in 2023
- Type: Passport
- Issued by: Ministry of Foreign Affairs (through the Federal Police)
- Purpose: Identification
- Valid in: All countries with which Brazil maintains diplomatic relations
- Eligibility: Brazilian citizenship
- Expiration: 1 year after issuance for children up to the age of 1; 2 years for children at the age of 2; 3 years for children at the age of 3; 4 years for children at the age of 4; 5 years for applicants aged 5 to 18, and 10 years for all other applicants (aged 18 and above)
- Cost: BRL 257.25

Brazilian passport (Portuguese: Passaporte brasileiro) is the official document for foreign travel issued by the Ministry of Foreign Affairs, through the Federal Police.

A new model was officially introduced in July 2015 that complies with both Mercosul and ICAO standards, and bring a new biometric cryptography method, and replaces the last model, from 2010. The new passport is valid for 10 years.

As a general rule, Brazilian passports are valid for ten years from the date of issue. They cannot be renewed: a new passport must be obtained when the previous one has expired or a minimum validity period is required by the country to be visited. If a passport is lost, the replacement will be valid only for 5 or 4 years from the date of issuance. If lost and replaced again the validity of the same is 2 years.

Brazilian passports can be ordered by mail only if is a renewal. The first issuance of a passport must be done in person at the Brazilian consulate that has jurisdiction over the person's residence in a foreign country. The instructions say that whether applying for a "new" passport or a "renewal", the same application is used.

Brazilian citizens do not need a passport when traveling to most other South American countries (Argentina, Bolivia, Chile, Colombia, Ecuador, Peru, Paraguay, Uruguay, Venezuela). For these countries, they may use just their domestic identification cards.

Prior to July 2015, the Federal Police Department issued passports valid for five years, but now passports are only issued with five years of validity if it is a replacement for a lost passport. It was extended from five to ten years.

According to the Henley Passport Index, in 2025, the Brazilian passport allows visa-free access to 170 countries, making it the 16th strongest passport in the world and the second in Latin America, tied with Argentina.

== History ==
The term "passport" was first inserted into the Old Republic Constitution of Brazil in 1891, which defined that anyone of any nationality could enter and leave the country during peacetime. However, there are records of travel documents being checked at Brazilian ports of entry from as early as 1530, and during the 19th century wave of immigration to Brazil, passports from overseas were checked as well.

== The "green" (old) and "blue" (new) models ==
The newest biometric version of the Brazilian passport was introduced in April 2019, which restored the Brazilian coat of arms to the front cover.

The second biometric version of the Brazilian passport was introduced in July 2015, which for the first time replaced the Brazilian coat of arms with a representation of the constellation of the Southern Cross on the front cover. The validity was extended from five to ten years.

The first biometric version of the Brazilian passport was introduced in November 2010.

The last machine-readable version of the Brazilian passport, introduced in December 2006, follows the standard established by the Mercosul countries concerning cover color (dark blue for common passports) and the printing of the name Mercosul (Portuguese) or Mercosur (Spanish) on the upper portion of the cover, with the country name below it. The new passport model was first issued to Brazilian citizens for travel outside the country in 2007 and by May 2010 was the sole model being issued.

The previous, "old" model has a dark-green cover and is not machine-readable. It does not have the name Mercosul printed on its cover, either. The even older model (also green) that was used until the 1970s, following that time's diplomatic tradition, had the inside pages printed only in Portuguese and French; the more recent "green" model has text in Portuguese, French and English. The latest, "blue" model is in four languages: Portuguese, French, English and Spanish, but the page with the holder's identification data is in Portuguese and English only, and the cover only in Portuguese (the same goes to the new "green" cover).

Older passports (the "green" model) were produced either by Casa da Moeda do Brasil, the government's official mint, or by the American Bank Note Company. New passports (the "blue" model) are made solely by Casa da Moeda.

In January 2019, president Jair Bolsonaro ordered the return of the coat of arms on the passport cover.

=== The "blue" passport's features ===
The current Brazilian passport is machine-readable, complying with the ICAO Document 9303 standard and biometric. When the passport is first issued, the holder's fingerprints, signature and photograph are digitally acquired and stored in a database, but only the holder's digital picture is coded in the physical passport, in a two-dimensional barcode. The latter, as well as the holder's personal identification data and his or her picture are directly laser-printed on the passport; only the holder's signature is handwritten in the traditional way. (Since the old "green" model was designed in the 1970s, before computer technology became widely available, the holder's data are typewritten or even handwritten on it.) At 8.5 × 12.5 cm (3.35 × 5.31 inches), the new passport model is 1 cm (0.39 inch) shorter in height than its predecessor.

Passports issued before November 2010 do not contain an RFID chip, but do contain about 20 advanced security features, including a security band embedded within the paper pulp, sewing threads and watermarks with a red fluorescence under ultraviolet light, latent images, optically variable ink, laser perforations and a holographic plastic film protecting the holder's data page.

In November 2010, the Brazilian passport began being issued with an RFID chip.

In June 2022, the government announced the passport would have new design and security features. The new passport was intended to be issued on the day of Bicentennial Independence Day in September that year, but it was postponed, and it was only issued for the first time on October 3, 2023.

=== Identification page ===
It has a data page with a machine-readable zone and a digital photograph of the passport holder. All the information is written in Portuguese and English.

- Photograph (5x7 cm, white background, full face in view)
- Document type (P for Passport)
- Issuing country (BRA = Brazil)
- Passport number
- Surname(s)
- Given name(s)
- Nationality (Brasileiro(a))
- Birth date
- Personal number (CPF number)
- Sex
- Birthplace (locality and the federated unit code, or place and country of birth – if born abroad)
- Filiation (the legal ascendant(s))
- Issue date
- Expiry date
- Issuing authority

The bearer's signature is placed on the third page.

As of November 2014, passports include the holder's legal guardians/parents' name and minor's travel consent on the data page. Until then, minors required notarized permission to leave Brazil.

Before the 2023 version, the Personal number field was in blank by default. However, as of October 2023, this field includes the holder's CPF number.

== Passport message ==
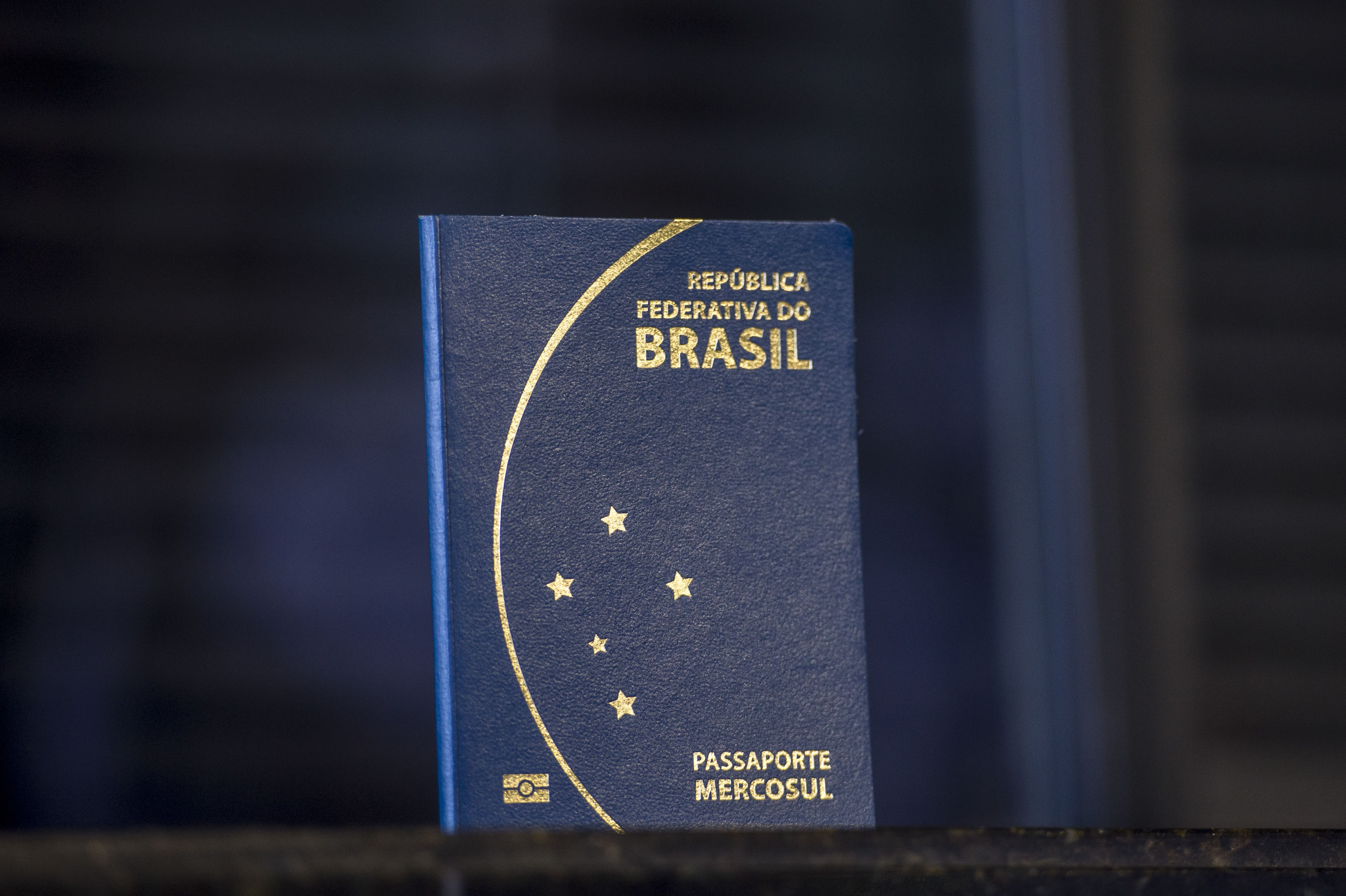
The cover of the second biometric type of Brazilian passport (issued 2015–2019) represented the constellation of the Southern Cross.

Passports of many countries contain a message, nominally from the official or office in charge of passport issuance (e.g., Secretary of State, Minister of Foreign Affairs), addressed to authorities of other countries. The message identifies the bearer as a citizen of the issuing country, requests free passage through the other country, and requests further that, when necessary, aid and protection be afforded as per international laws.

In Brazilian passports, there is no highlight to the message whatsoever, nor is it referred to as a message from Brazilian authorities. It is printed on the back of the front cover, as well as three other information blocks. It is in Portuguese, French, English and Spanish. The message is:

In Portuguese:

Roga-se às autoridades estrangeiras que prestem ao titular deste passaporte auxílio e assistência em caso de necessidade.

in French:

Les autorités des États étrangers sont priées de bien vouloir prêter au titulaire de ce passeport aide et assistance au besoin.

in English:

Foreign authorities are requested to afford the bearer such assistance and protection as may be necessary.

and in Spanish:

Se ruega a las autoridades extranjeras que presten al titular de este pasaporte auxilio y asistencia en caso de necesidad.

== Visa requirements map ==
Visa requirements for Brazilian citizens holding ordinary passports Brazil Freedom of movement / ID card valid Visa not required / ETA (Note: ETA required for Israel,Kenya, New Zealand, Saint Kitts and Nevis, Seychelles, South Korea and the United Kingdom.) Visa on arrival eVisa Visa available both on arrival or online Visa required

Visa requirements for Brazilian citizens are administrative entry restrictions by the authorities of other States placed on citizens of Brazil. As of 2026, Brazilian citizens have visa-free or visa on arrival access to 168 countries and territories, ranking the Brazilian passport 15th in the world according to the Henley Passport Index.

Brazilians within Mercosul have unlimited access to any of the full members (Argentina, Bolivia, Paraguay, Uruguay) and some of its associated members (Chile, Peru, Colombia, Ecuador) with the right to residence and work, with no requirement other than nationality. Citizens of these nine countries (including Brazil) may apply for the grant of "temporary residence" for up to two years in another country of the bloc. Before the expiration of the term of "temporary residence", they may apply for their transformation into permanent residence.

== Issuing process ==
Prior to 2006, passport applications were made by filling out a form by hand which one could download from the Federal Police's website and the applicant must show up at the issuing post with the required documents. As of 2006, passport applications are now made exclusively through the Internet, on the Federal Police Department's Web site. One fills the necessary information in an on-line form and must print the application form and the bank document for paying the required fee. If the new-model passport is going to be issued (the site will inform if it is available at the chosen city and post), an appointment must be previously scheduled; this is also done on-line.

At the scheduled time (or at any time during the passport issuing post's working hours, for the old model), the applicant goes to the chosen Federal Police post with the required documents (no photograph needed for the new model, since the photo is taken digitally on the spot) and the passport will be ready at most six working days later (usually less). There is no fast-track system under ordinary circumstances.

The applicant's physical presence at the post is required for both applying for and picking up the passport, even if the old-model version will be issued. Special cases where the applicant is unable to go in person for relevant reasons (such as health issues) must be arranged with the authorities on a case-by-case basis.

As of July 2015, the passport issuing fee is R$257 (US$45.95). The fee can be paid at any Brazilian bank, including Internet and home banking, with a document that is issued during the on-line application process and can be printed for payment. The fee is doubled if there is a previously issued passport and it is not produced when applying for a new one, but in practice this is rarely enforced.

Normally required documents for adult persons are listed below. Actual requirements are subject to change and there are special cases. Special requirements apply for minors (under 18 years of age).

For all applicants:

- federative unit-issued ID card or other officially recognised form of identification;
- birth certificate;
- Federal Revenue Secretariat (income tax) registration certificate (known as "CPF", will be waived if the number already appears on the ID document, which is common);
- receipt of payment of the passport fee;
- application form printed from the on-line page.

If applicable:

- voter registration certificate, with proof of having voted in the latest elections or legally justified the absence (voting is compulsory in Brazil for people between the ages of 18 and 65)
- military service, conscription or waiver certificate (for males 18 through 45 years old);
- previous passport, if any (regardless of validity);
- two 5 × 7-cm photographs (for the old-model passport only);
- marriage certificate;
- judicial name change authorisation or sentence;
- naturalisation certificate.

== Special passports ==
Other types of Brazilian passports are issued with different colors, but all incorporate the new design and security features:

- Red: diplomatic passport;
- Green: official passport (for officers on duty for the Brazilian government, but without diplomatic immunity);
- Brown: laissez-passer for foreigners to travel to Brazil under special circumstances;
- Yellow: for holders of refugee status and stateless people in Brazil;
- Light blue: passport for emergency repatriation of Brazilians.

== Fraudulent use ==
Legitimate blank Brazilian passports from the Embassy of Brazil in Prague were used to create fraudulent identification documents for the leaders of North Korea, including Kim Jong Il and Kim Jong Un in the 1990s.

== Gallery of historic images ==
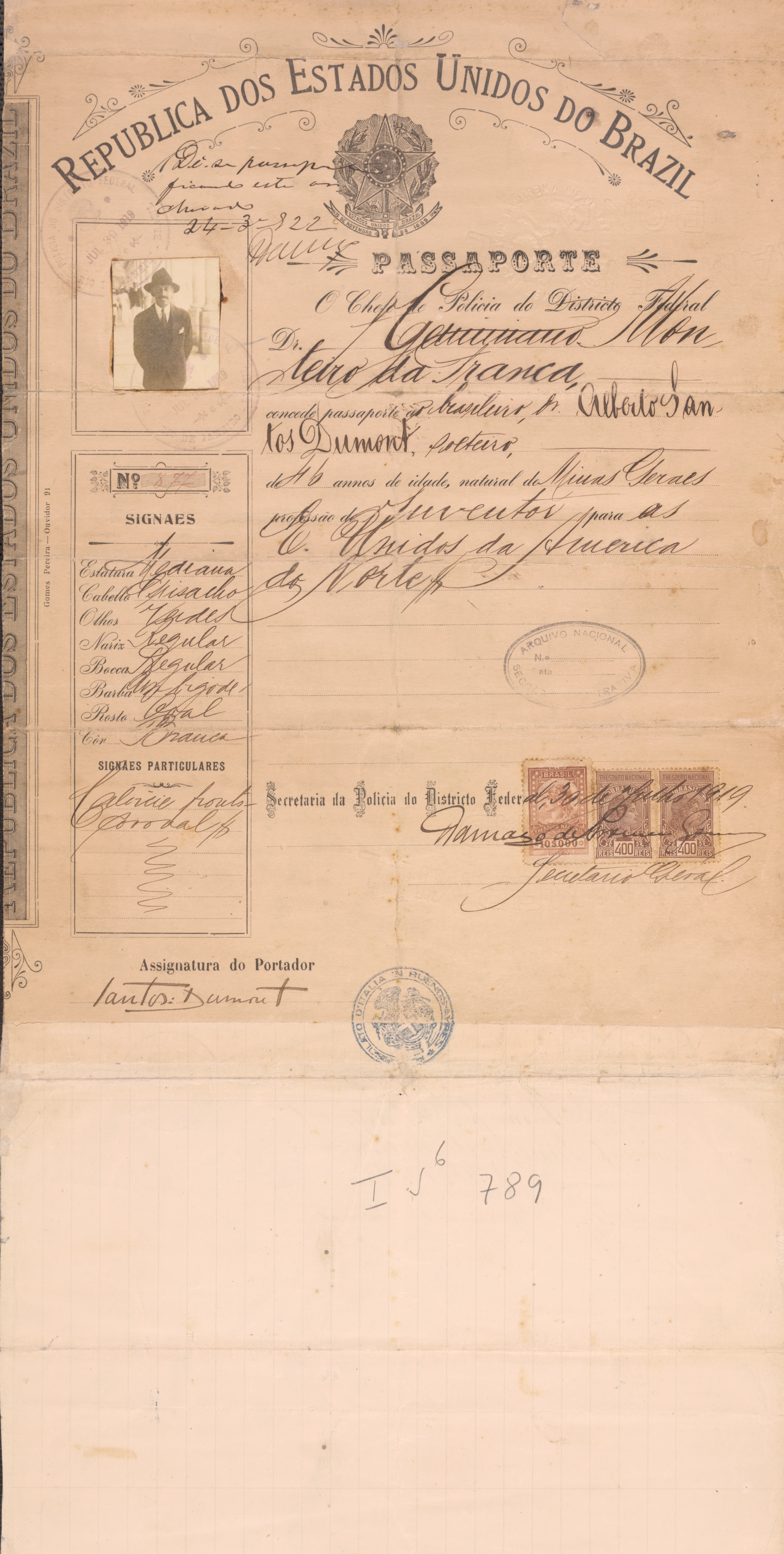
First Brazilian Republic passport issued to Alberto Santos-Dumont in 1919.

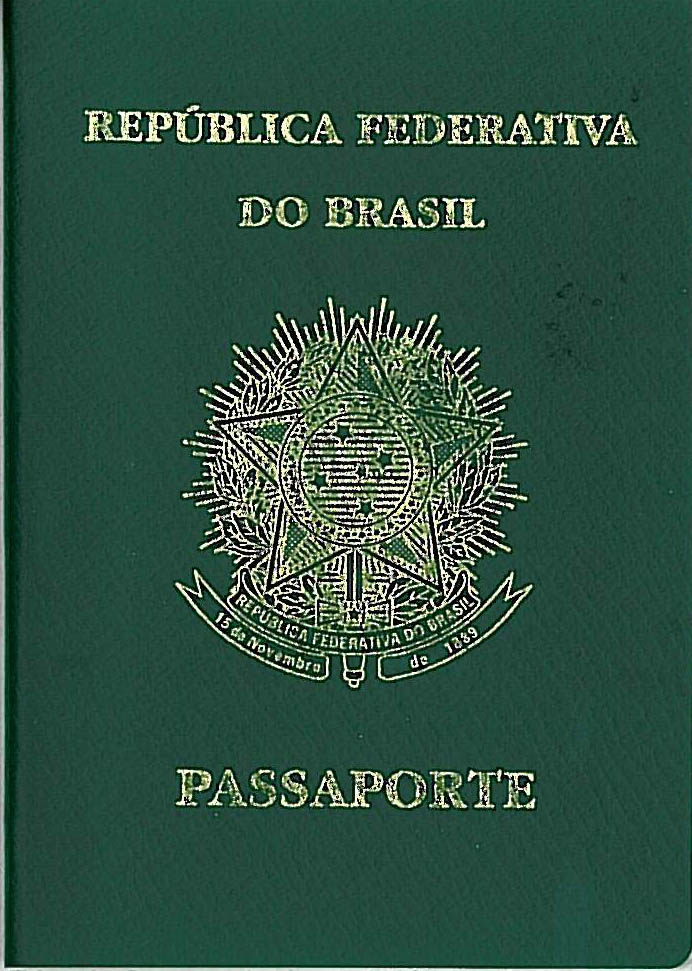
Old (dark green) version of the Brazilian passport, in use since the late 1970s.

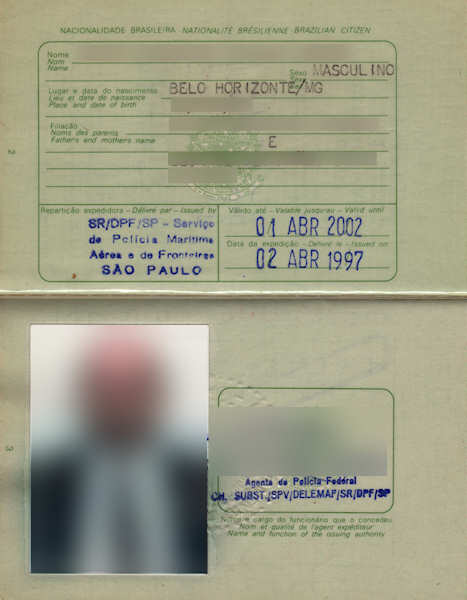
Sample identification page of old-model ("green") Brazilian passport. This model's original design in the 1970s predated widespread computer technology, so data are either typewritten or stamped, there is no machine-readable code, and an ordinary photograph is glued to the page. A plain adhesive plastic sheet protects the page.

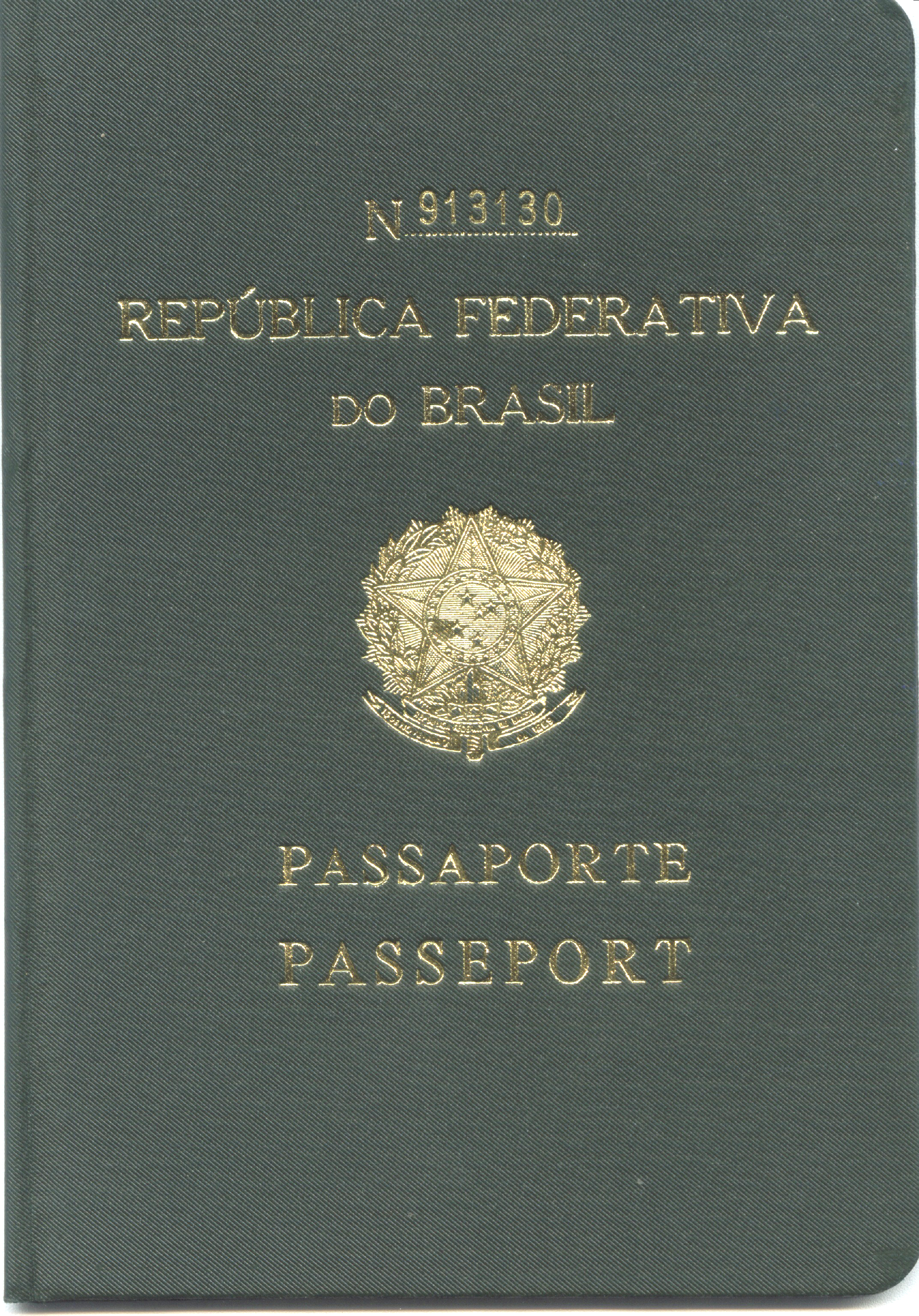
Even older model, issued until the 1970s.

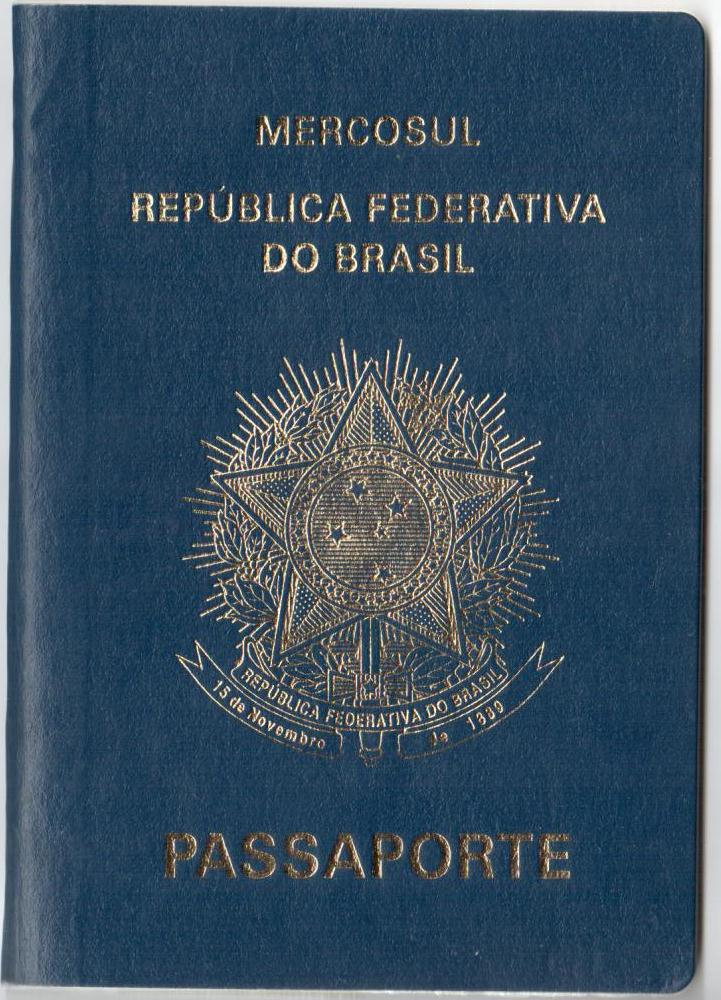
Non-biometric passport, issued from December 2006 until 2010.

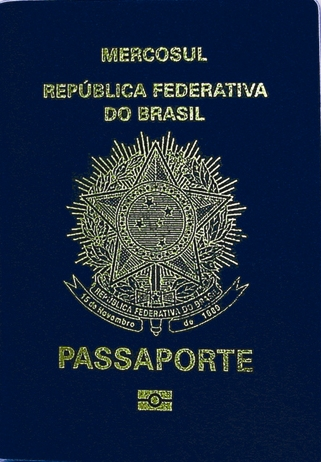
First biometric model Brazilian passport, issued from 2010 until 2015.

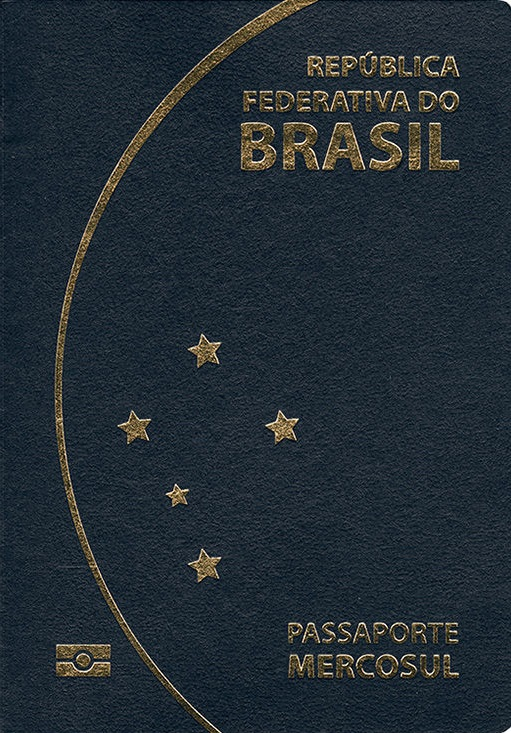
Second biometric model Brazilian passport, issued from 2015 until 2019

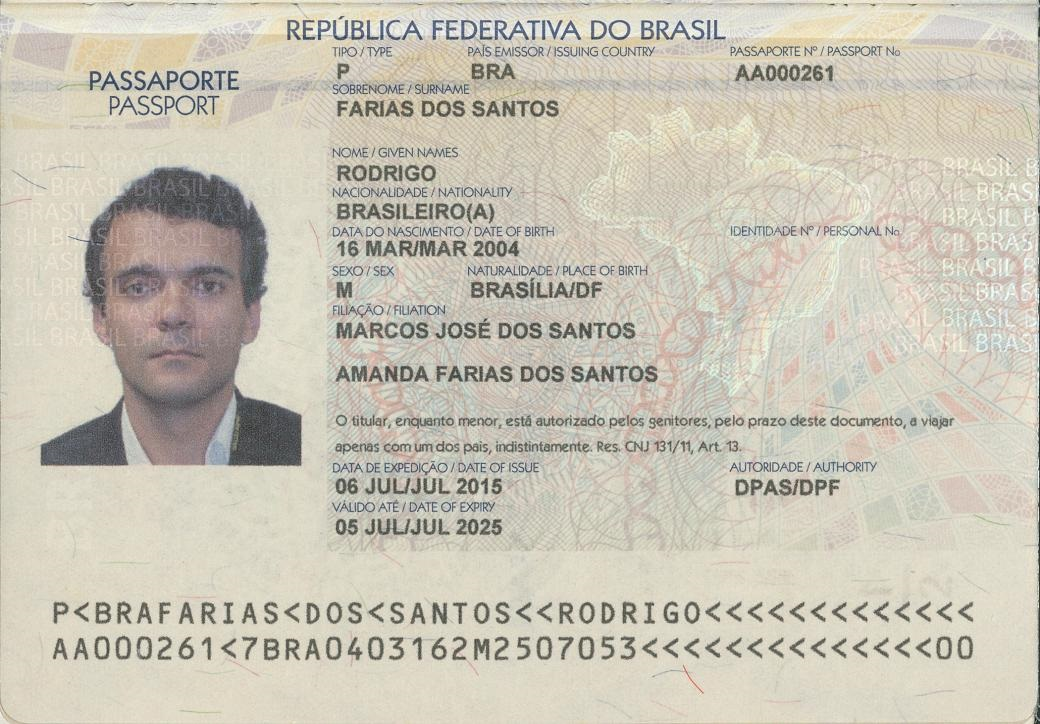
Data page of the 2015 version

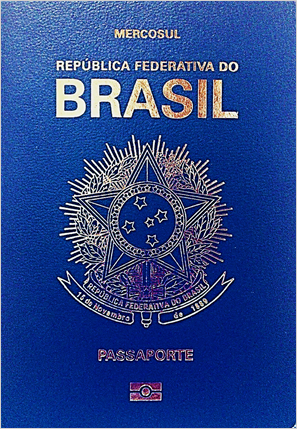
Third biometric model Brazilian passport, issued from 2019 until September 2023

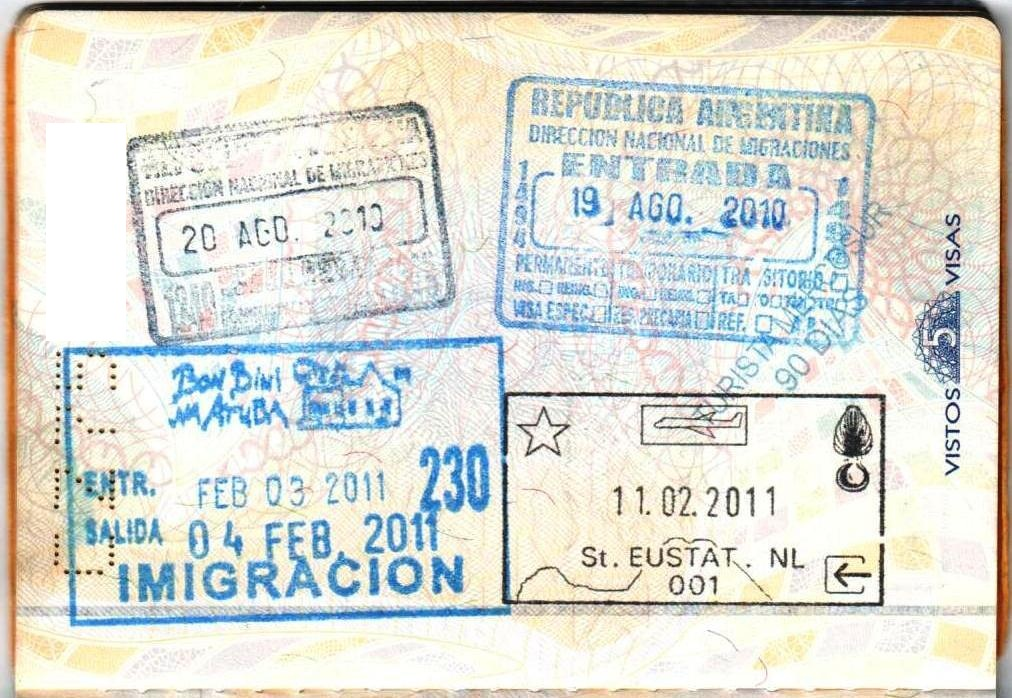
Visa stamps on a Brazilian passport.

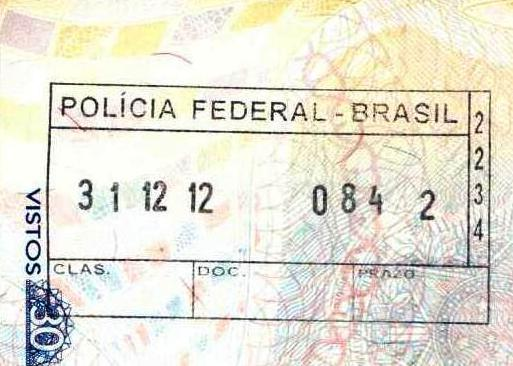
Brazilian immigration exit stamp.

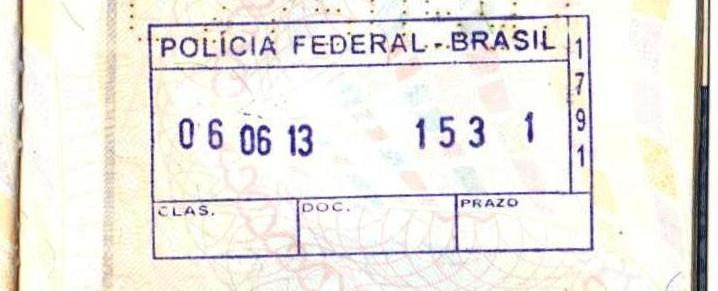
Brazilian immigration entry stamp.

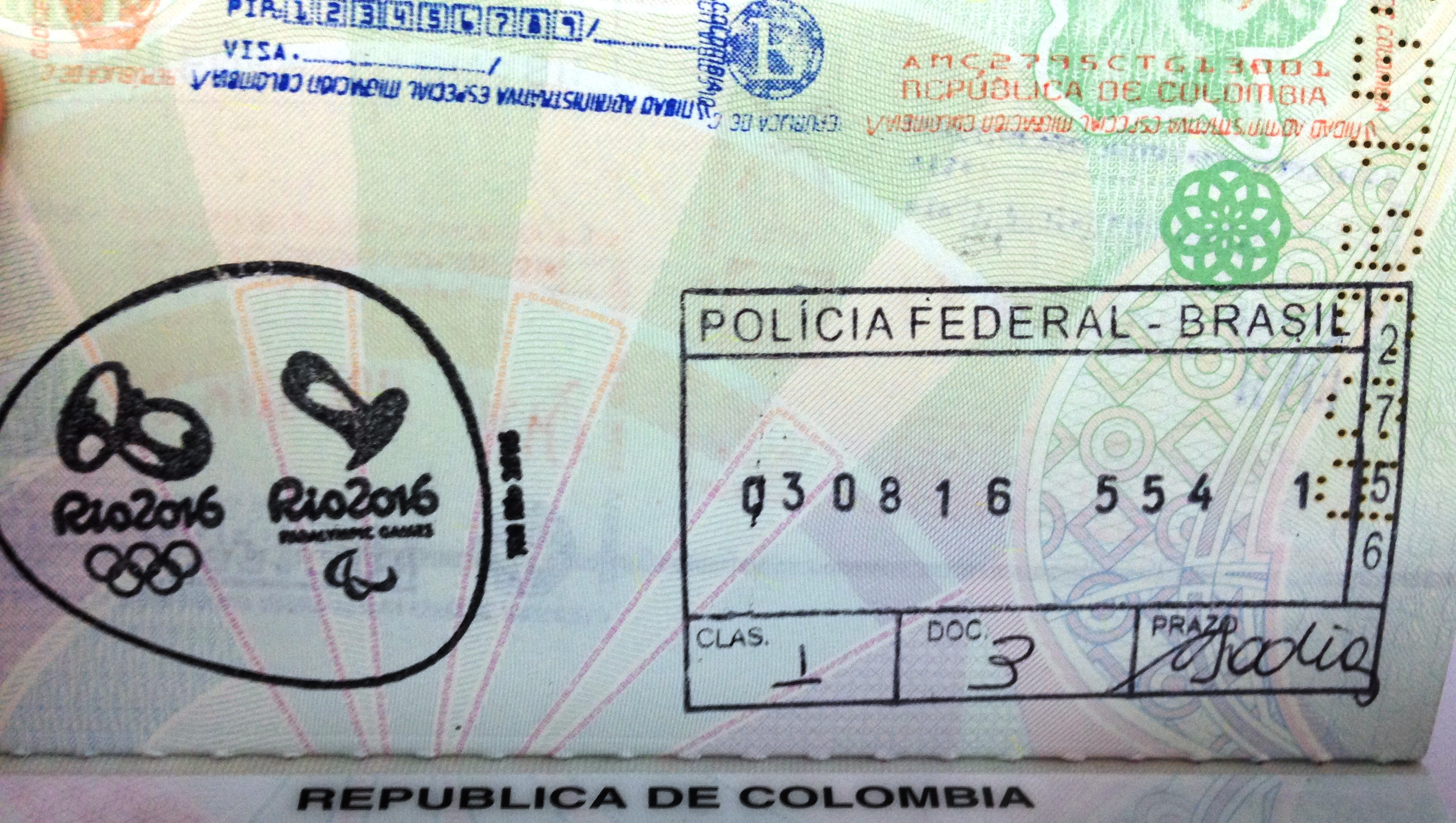
Special Brazilian 2016 Olympics and Paralympics Stamp.

== See also ==
- Andean passport
- Visa policy of Brazil
