= Visa policy of Brazil =

Policy on permits required to enter Brazil

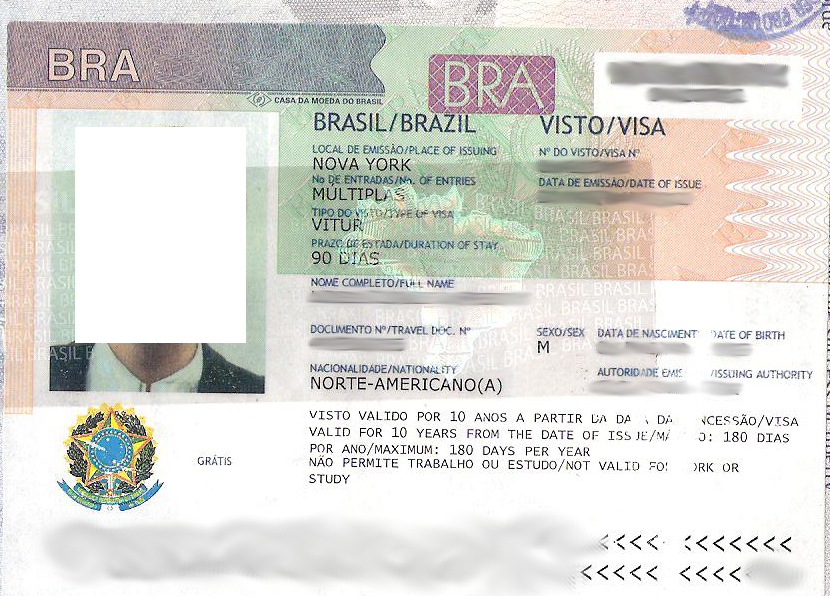
Brazilian visa

Visitors to Brazil must obtain a visa from one of the Brazilian diplomatic missions unless they are nationals of one of the visa-exempt countries or have the option to obtain an electronic visa. Visa exemptions to enter Brazil have generally been reciprocal, on the principle that the other country should similarly offer visa-free entry to Brazilian nationals.

For stays longer than 90 days or for employment in Brazil, all foreign nationals must have a visa or residency authorization.

== Visa policy map ==
Visa policy of Brazil Brazil Visa not required (may enter with an identity card) Visa not required Electronic visa for all visitor categories Electronic visa for business only Visa required

== Visa exemption ==
=== Ordinary passports ===
Holders of ordinary passports of the following countries and entities may enter Brazil without a visa for up to 90 days (unless otherwise noted).

- European Union member states (Note: For nationals of Ireland: 90 days. For nationals of other European Union member states: 90 days within any 180-day period.)
- European Free Trade Association member states (Note: 90 days within any 180-day period.)
- Albania
- Andorra
- Antigua and Barbuda
- Argentina (Note: May enter with an identity card if arriving from a Mercosur member state or associate state.)
- Armenia
- Bahamas
- Barbados
- Belarus
- Belize
- Bolivia
- Bosnia and Herzegovina
- Botswana
- Chile
- China (Note: 30 days within any 12-month period. Visa exemption until 31 December 2026.)
- Colombia
- Costa Rica
- Dominica
- Dominican Republic (Note: 60 days)
- Ecuador
- El Salvador
- Fiji
- Georgia
- Grenada
- Guatemala
- Guyana
- Honduras
- Hong Kong
- Indonesia (Note: 30 days)
- Israel
- Jamaica
- Japan (Note: Visa exemption scheduled until 29 September 2029, may be extended.)
- Kazakhstan
- Macau
- Malaysia
- Mexico
- Micronesia
- Moldova
- Monaco
- Mongolia
- Montenegro
- Morocco
- Namibia
- New Zealand
- Nicaragua
- North Macedonia
- Order of Malta
- Panama
- Paraguay
- Peru
- Philippines
- Qatar
- Russia
- Saint Kitts and Nevis
- Saint Lucia
- Saint Vincent and the Grenadines
- San Marino
- Serbia
- Seychelles
- Singapore
- South Africa
- South Korea
- Suriname
- Thailand
- Trinidad and Tobago
- Tunisia
- Turkey
- Ukraine
- United Arab Emirates (Note: The agreement specifies 90 days within any 12-month period, but the Brazilian government does not apply the 12-month limitation.)
- United Kingdom
- Uruguay
- Vatican City
- Venezuela

Date of visa changes

The dates below refer to the entry into force of reciprocal agreements, unless otherwise noted.

- 1 August 1931: Austria (replaced by another agreement from 21 October 1967)
- 5 February 1948: Switzerland (for tourism)
- 11 December 1948: Liechtenstein (for tourism)
- 21 July 1953: Denmark
- 19 March 1956: Argentina, Bolivia, Canada, Chile, Colombia, Costa Rica, Cuba, Dominican Republic, Ecuador, El Salvador, Guatemala, Haiti, Honduras, Mexico, Nicaragua, Panama, Paraguay, Peru, United States, Uruguay, Venezuela (unilateral exemption for tourism; Cuba ended 24 June 1970, others replaced with reciprocal exemption or ended 22 September 1978)
- 5 March 1960: Paraguay
- 11 October 1965: Spain
- 1 April 1969: Finland
- 5 May 1969: Mexico (ended 20 November 1990)
- 26 August 1969: Colombia
- 28 August 1969: Iceland
- 24 June 1970: Guyana, Trinidad and Tobago (unilateral exemption for tourism; replaced with reciprocal exemption or ended 22 September 1978); Belgium, France, Greece, Ireland, Italy, Luxembourg, Morocco, Netherlands, Norway, Portugal, Sweden, United Kingdom, West Germany (reciprocal exemption for tourism); removed Cuba
- 7 April 1971: Trinidad and Tobago (for tourism)
- 22 August 1972: Philippines (replaced by another agreement from 25 October 1973)
- 12 July 1973: Ecuador
- 22 September 1978: ended unilateral exemptions
- 1 March 1985: France (replaced by another agreement from 27 June 1996)
- 15 November 1988: Suriname
- 20 November 1990: removed Mexico
- 27 November 1990: Venezuela (for tourism)
- 28 November 1992: Namibia (for tourism)
- 28 December 1995: Bolivia (for tourism)
- 30 August 1996: Slovenia
- 6 December 1996: Costa Rica
- 26 December 1996: South Africa
- 25 January 1997: Portugal (replaced by other agreements from 5 September 2001 and 5 December 2007)
- 2 July 1998: United Kingdom
- 22 July 1999: Malaysia (for tourism)
- 27 October 1999: Thailand
- 22 April 2000: Poland
- 29 August 2000: Israel
- before 15 February 2001: Monaco, San Marino, Vatican City; Argentina, Belgium, Chile, Germany, Greece, Ireland, Italy, Luxembourg, Morocco, Netherlands, Norway, Peru, Sweden, Switzerland, Uruguay (for business); Andorra, Bahamas, Barbados (for tourism); removed Canada, Dominican Republic, El Salvador, Guatemala, Guyana, Haiti, Honduras, Nicaragua, Panama, United States
- 19 July 2001: Hungary
- 7 January 2002: Panama (for tourism)
- 20 May 2002: South Korea
- before 3 June 2002: Macau
- 1 July 2004: Turkey
- 7 February 2004: Mexico (suspended from 23 October 2005 to 16 May 2013)
- 6 August 2004: Tunisia
- 21 October 2004: New Zealand
- before 8 December 2004: Order of Malta; Trinidad and Tobago (for business)
- 6 August 2005: Slovakia
- 16 September 2005: Bolivia (for business)
- 3 October 2005: Czech Republic
- 7 October 2005: Bulgaria
- 23 October 2005: suspended Mexico
- 3 November 2005: Guyana (for tourism)
- 5 January 2006: Guatemala (for tourism)
- 31 March 2006: Honduras (suspended from 5 September 2009 to 20 July 2011)
- 17 August 2006: Croatia
- 11 November 2007: Romania
- 22 October 2008: Hong Kong
- 25 October 2008: Lithuania
- 5 September 2009: suspended Honduras
- 19 February 2010: El Salvador
- 7 June 2010: Russia
- 1 April 2011: Venezuela (for business)
- 20 July 2011: resumed Honduras
- 30 October 2011: Ukraine
- 1 October 2012: Cyprus, Estonia, Latvia, Malta
- 4 April 2013: Bosnia and Herzegovina
- 16 May 2013: resumed Mexico
- 11 July 2013: Guyana (for business)
- 17 August 2013: Serbia
- 9 January 2014: Singapore
- 9 July 2014: Grenada
- 14 November 2014: Saint Vincent and the Grenadines
- 29 November 2014: Albania
- 20 December 2014: Antigua and Barbuda
- 7 March 2015: Saint Kitts and Nevis
- 10 April 2015: Georgia
- 17 May 2015: Dominica
- 27 June 2015: Jamaica
- 13 September 2015: Belize
- 21 October 2015: Mongolia
- 25 November 2015: Armenia
- 1 June 2016: Australia, Canada, Japan, United States (unilateral exemption for tourism during 2016 Summer Olympics; ended 18 September 2016)
- 27 July 2016: Montenegro
- 27 August 2016: North Macedonia
- 6 September 2016: Kazakhstan
- 18 September 2016: removed Australia, Canada, Japan, United States (end of unilateral exemption for tourism)
- 23 October 2016: Seychelles
- 25 November 2016: Belarus
- 29 June 2017: Fiji
- 21 November 2017: Andorra, Bahamas, Barbados, Guatemala, Liechtenstein, Malaysia, Namibia, Panama (for business)
- 21 November 2017: electronic visa for nationals of Australia (ended 13 June 2019)
- 20 December 2017: Nicaragua
- 11 January 2018: electronic visa for nationals of Japan (ended 13 June 2019)
- 18 January 2018: electronic visa for nationals of Canada (ended 13 June 2019)
- 25 January 2018: electronic visa for nationals of the United States (ended 13 June 2019)
- 2 June 2018: United Arab Emirates
- 10 June 2018: Indonesia
- 13 June 2019: discontinued applications for electronic visas
- 17 June 2019: Australia, Japan, Canada, United States (unilateral exemption; replaced with reciprocal exemption or electronic visa on 10 April 2025)
- 27 December 2019: Qatar
- 21 October 2021: Dominican Republic
- 13 March 2022: Moldova
- 26 July 2022: Botswana
- 30 September 2023: Japan
- 14 January 2024: Saint Lucia
- 10 April 2025: ended unilateral exemption, resumed electronic visa for nationals of Australia, Canada, United States
- 18 July 2025: Micronesia
- 20 October 2025: electronic visa for nationals of India (for business)
- 19 January 2026: electronic visa for nationals of China (for business)
- 11 May 2026: China

Visitors entering Brazil under a visa exemption are subject to the same restrictions as those entering Brazil with a visitor visa (for tourism, business, transit, artistic and sport activities, without payment from Brazilian sources). They are required to hold a ticket for entering and leaving Brazil, proof of accommodation or a notarized invitation letter, and proof of funds of at least R$248 per day.

Visas are not required for airport transit, from any nationality, as long as the traveler does not leave the international transit area.

Nationals of Brazil who also have another nationality are allowed to enter and leave Brazil with the passport of the other country, and may apply for a Brazilian visa on such passport if needed, including an electronic visa if applicable for such nationality. When entering Brazil, if they also present a Brazilian identity card, they are admitted as Brazilians, otherwise they are admitted as foreigners, subject to the regular limitations as such.

=== Non-ordinary passports ===
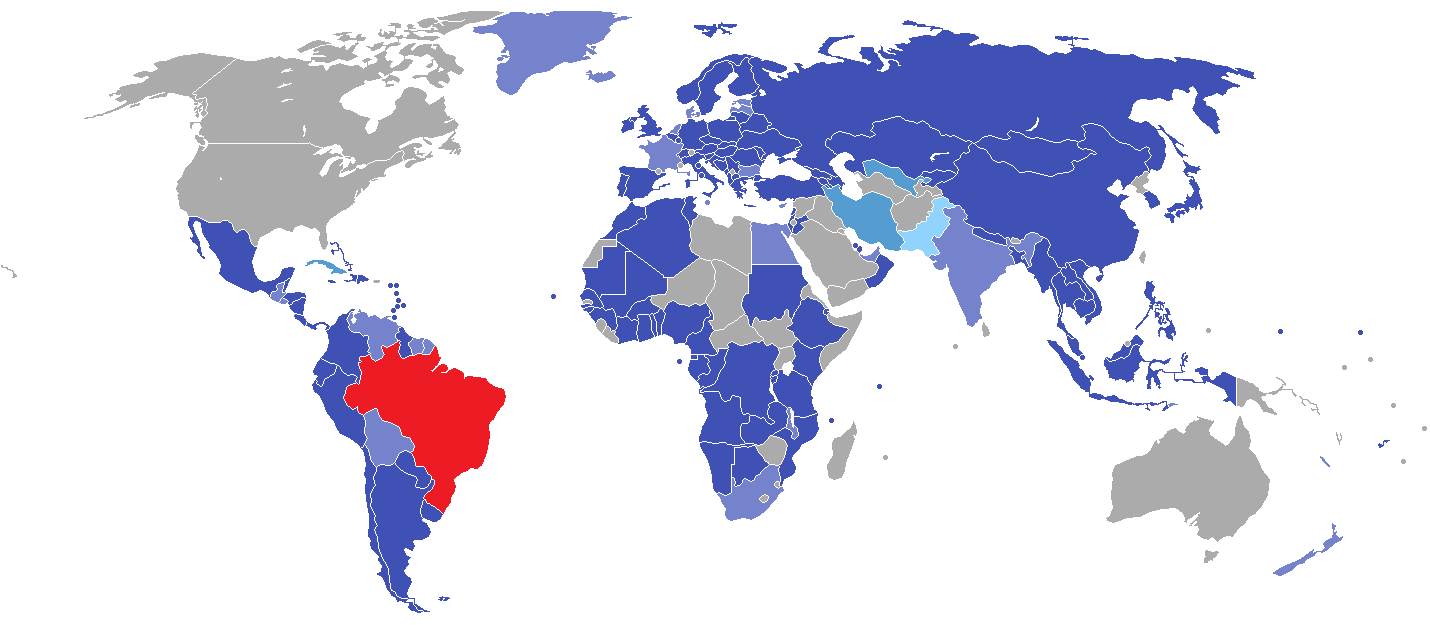
Visa exemption to Brazil for holders of diplomatic, official and service passports Brazil Diplomatic, official or service passports Diplomatic, official or service passports (not accredited to Brazil) Diplomatic passports Diplomatic passports (not accredited to Brazil)

Holders of diplomatic, official or service passports of countries that are visa-exempt (listed above) may enter Brazil without a visa (except Andorra, Liechtenstein and Monaco). (Note: For holders of diplomatic, official or service passports of Bolivia, Bulgaria, Cyprus, Denmark, El Salvador, Estonia, France, Guatemala, Iceland, Latvia, Malta, Netherlands, New Zealand, South Africa, Suriname, United Arab Emirates, and for holders of official or service passports of Venezuela: the exemption only applies if the holder is not accredited to Brazil.)

In addition, holders of diplomatic, official or service passports of the following countries may enter Brazil without a visa.

Holders of diplomatic, official or service passports
- Algeria
- Angola
- Azerbaijan
- Bahrain
- Bangladesh
- Benin
- Burkina Faso
- Burundi
- Cambodia
- Cameroon
- Cape Verde
- Comoros
- Côte d'Ivoire
- Dem. Rep. Congo
- Djibouti
- Egypt (Note: Only if the holder is not accredited to Brazil.)
- Equatorial Guinea
- Ethiopia
- Gabon
- Ghana
- Guinea
- Guinea-Bissau
- Haiti
- India
- Jordan
- Kenya
- Kyrgyzstan
- Laos
- Lebanon
- Malawi
- Mali
- Marshall Islands
- Mauritania
- Mozambique
- Myanmar
- Nepal
- Nigeria
- Oman
- Republic of the Congo
- Rwanda
- São Tomé and Príncipe
- Senegal
- Sri Lanka
- Sudan
- Tanzania
- Timor-Leste
- Togo
- Vietnam
- Zambia
Holders of diplomatic passports
- Cuba
- Iran
- Pakistan
- Uzbekistan

=== Proposed changes ===
Brazil has signed visa exemption agreements with the following countries, but they are not yet in force:

| Country | Passports | Period of stay | Note |
|---|---|---|---|
| Sierra Leone | Diplomatic, official or service | 90 days | In addition, the entire period of a mission if accredited to Brazil. |

The Mexican government unilaterally suspended its visa exemption agreement with Brazil, requiring an electronic authorization for Brazilians to travel to Mexico from 11 December 2021, and a visa from 18 August 2022. However, the Brazilian government maintained the visa exemption for Mexicans to travel to Brazil at the time. In July 2023, both governments announced their intention to adopt electronic visas for each other's nationals. In September 2024, the Brazilian government contracted VFS Global for this purpose. In September 2025, Brazil announced that it would implement electronic visas for Mexicans after Mexico did so for Brazilians. Mexico implemented electronic visas for Brazilians on 5 February 2026.

In March 2025, the Brazilian Senate approved a proposal to restore the unilateral visa exemption for nationals of Australia, Canada and the United States (as well as Japan, which had a reciprocal exemption). To take effect, the proposal would also need approval by the Chamber of Deputies but not by the president.

=== Reciprocity ===
Brazil has generally required reciprocity for visa exemptions, meaning that it would exempt from its visa requirement only nationals of countries that did not require a visa from Brazilians. However, sometimes Brazil adopted unilateral visa exemptions for nationals of certain countries, or continued exemptions after other countries suspended reciprocity.

From 1956 to 1978, Brazil unilaterally exempted from its visa requirement the nationals of all countries in the Americas that had diplomatic relations with it.

Brazil unilaterally exempted nationals of Australia, Canada, Japan and the United States from its visa requirement from 1 June to 18 September 2016, to facilitate tourism during the 2016 Summer Olympics held there. Under the presidency of Jair Bolsonaro, Brazil again unilaterally exempted nationals of these four countries from its visa requirement on 17 June 2019. After three extensions, the subsequent Lula administration revoked the unilateral exemption on 10 April 2025.

In response to the COVID-19 pandemic, Ireland suspended its visa exemption for nationals of Brazil and other South American countries from 28 January to 16 June 2021, but Brazil maintained its visa exemption for nationals of Ireland during this period.

Mexico suspended its visa exemption agreement with Brazil and started requiring visas from Brazilians on 18 August 2022, but Brazil maintained its visa exemption for Mexicans. Both countries intended to restore reciprocity with electronic visas.

== Electronic visa (e-Visa) ==
Nationals of the following countries may apply for visitor visas electronically:

For all visitor categories
- Australia
- Canada
- United States
For business only
- China (Note: Fully electronic application and visa are available for seafarers and to attend business events and exhibitions. Other business travelers must submit documents physically but may also receive electronic visas.)
- India

Nationals of countries exempt from visitor visas may apply for all types of temporary visas electronically. All diplomatic and official visas are also processed electronically.

Nationals and stateless residents of Haiti who have a family member in Brazil, who was granted residency under the humanitarian category and requested residency for them before 2025, may apply for family reunification visas electronically until the end of 2026.

Accredited participants in the 2027 FIFA Women's World Cup, to be held in Brazil from 24 June to 25 July 2027, may apply for temporary visas electronically, valid until the end of 2027. Holders of tickets for this event may also apply for visitor visas electronically from June 2027, valid for entry until the end of the event.

== Visa types and requirements ==
=== Visitor visa ===
The visitor visa (VIVIS) allows stays of up to 90 days, for the following purposes:

- Tourism, including cultural and recreational activities, family visits, attending conferences, volunteer work, research, study and teaching;
- Business, including meetings, events, reporting, filming, surveying, signing contracts, audits, consulting, airplane and ship crew;
- Transit;
- Artistic and sport activities.

Holders of visitor visas are not allowed to receive payment from Brazilian sources for the activities during their stay, except for daily allowances for living expenses, payments for entertainment performances, compensation for management of their own business, reimbursement of travel expenses, and competition prizes.

The visitor visa is usually valid for multiple entries during the visa validity period, which is generally one year but may be longer for some nationalities. Each stay is initially limited to 90 days, but an extension may be requested from the Federal Police after arrival. The combined stays must not exceed 180 days per any one-year period.

=== Temporary visa ===
Many types of temporary visas (VITEM) are available, for stays longer than 90 days. Certain types of visas allow employment in Brazil. For some visas based on work or investment, the applicant must obtain authorization from the General Coordination of Immigration (CGIG) before requesting the visa.

All holders of temporary visas intending to stay for more than 90 days are required to register with the Federal Police within 90 days after arrival. After registration, they receive a national migration registration card (CRNM) and are granted residency for a certain period. In some cases this period may be "indeterminate" (permanent residency). Temporary residents may later apply to renew their residency period or convert it to permanent residency in some cases. Only the time spent as a permanent resident qualifies for naturalization.

In addition to registration, a taxpayer number (CPF) is required for various transactions, and a work card (CTPS) is required for those who will be employed in Brazil. These documents may be obtained in digital format online, free of charge.

Summary of temporary visas
| VITEM | Category | Employment in Brazil | CGIG authorization | Nationality | Residency |
|---|---|---|---|---|---|
| I | Research, teaching or academic | yes | required | any | 2 years, then permanent (Note: In some cases, permanent from the start.) |
| I | Research, teaching or academic | no | not required | any | 2 years, renewable |
| II | Health care | not allowed | not required | any | 1 year, renewable |
| III | Humanitarian | allowed | not required | (Afghanistan) | 2 years, then permanent |
| IV | Student | allowed (Note: If compatible with the time required for study as well.) | not required | any | 1 year, renewable |
| V | Paid work | yes | required | any | 2 years, then permanent (Note: 5 years for professional athletes.) |
| V | Paid work | no | in some cases | any | 1 or 2 years (Note: In some cases, renewable or permanent from the start.) |
| VI | Working holiday | allowed | not required | (Australia) (France) (Germany) (New Zealand) (South Korea) | 1 year |
| VII | Religious | not allowed | not required | any | 2 years, then permanent |
| VIII | Volunteer work | not allowed | not required | any | 1 year, renewable |
| IX | Investment in business | not allowed | required | any | permanent from the start |
| IX | Investment in real estate | not allowed | required | any | 4 years, then permanent |
| X | Economic, scientific, technological or cultural | not implemented | | | |
| XI | Family reunification | allowed | not required | any | same as family member, or permanent after 4 years |
| XII | Artistic or sport | not allowed | required (Note: Not required for unpaid sport activities under age 18.) | any | 1 year, renewable |
| XIII | International agreements | allowed | not required | (Argentina) (Uruguay) | permanent from the start |
| XIII | International agreements | allowed | not required | (Bolivia) (Chile) (Colombia) (Ecuador) (Paraguay) (Peru) | 2 years, then permanent |
| XIV | Retirement | not allowed | not required | any | 2 years, then permanent |
| XIV | Digital nomad | not allowed | not required | any | 1 year, renewable |
| XIV | Community of Portuguese Language Countries | allowed | not required | (Angola) (Cape Verde) (Equatorial Guinea) (Guinea-Bissau) (Mozambique) (Portugal) (São Tomé and Príncipe) (Timor-Leste) | 2 years, then permanent |
| XV | Medical training | not allowed (Note: Dependents may be employed.) | not required | any | 4 years, renewable |

==== Humanitarian visa ====
VITEM III is a humanitarian visa for nationals or stateless residents of countries experiencing serious instability, armed conflict, disaster or violations of human rights. Residency is granted initially for two years, after which the applicant may request permanent residency.

Brazil has designated Afghanistan for this purpose. Previous designations of Haiti, Syria and Ukraine ended in 2026 for new visas, but nationals of these countries who previously entered Brazil may continue to request residency under this category.

==== Working holiday ====
VITEM VI is a working holiday visa, whose primary purpose must be tourism but paid work is also allowed. This visa is available only by international agreement with the country of nationality. Such agreements are in effect with Australia, France, Germany, New Zealand, and South Korea, and an agreement with Japan is set to take effect on 1 December 2026. These agreements require that the applicant be between ages 18 and 30 (up to age 34 for South Koreans), and allow a stay of up to one year.

==== Investment ====
VITEM IX is available for three types of investment. One type is for managers and executives whose companies invest at least R$600,000 in a Brazilian company, or at least R$150,000 and also generate at least 10 new jobs within two years. Another type is for applicants who personally invest at least R$500,000 in a Brazilian company, or at least R$150,000 in research activities. In both cases, the applicant is granted permanent residency from the start.

The other type of investment requires the personal purchase of urban real estate, for at least R$700,000 if located in the North or Northeast region, or at least R$1 million if located in another region. In this case, residency is granted initially for four years, after which the applicant may request permanent residency.

==== Family reunification ====
VITEM XI is available for spouses, domestic partners, children, grandchildren, parents, grandparents, dependent siblings and dependent stepchildren of a Brazilian national, or of a person holding or applying for Brazilian residency not also based on family reunification, and for legal guardians of a Brazilian national. For this visa, residency is granted initially for the same period as the family member. Applicants may request permanent residency when the family member acquires it or after four years of residency.

==== International agreements ====
VITEM XIII is available for nationals of countries with residency agreements. Agreements providing permanent residency from the start are in effect with Argentina and Uruguay. A Mercosur agreement is also in effect with Bolivia, Chile, Colombia, Ecuador, Paraguay and Peru, providing residency initially for two years, after which the applicant may request permanent residency.

==== Immigration policy ====
VITEM XIV is available in various categories under the Brazilian immigration policy.

One category is for retirees and beneficiaries of survivor pensions who have a monthly income of at least US$2,000 and can transfer it to Brazil. Residency is granted initially for two years, after which the applicant may request permanent residency.

Another category is for digital nomads, who work remotely for a foreign employer using telecommunications technology, with a monthly income of at least US$1,500 from a foreign payer or bank funds of at least US$18,000. Residency is granted for one year and may be renewed.

Based on an agreement of the Community of Portuguese Language Countries, VITEM XIV is also available for nationals of Angola, Cape Verde, Equatorial Guinea, Guinea-Bissau, Mozambique, Portugal, São Tomé and Príncipe and Timor-Leste who are professors, researchers, technicians, teachers, businesspeople, artists, athletes, managers of cultural and sport events, and exchange students. Nationals of these countries who are already in Brazil, regardless of occupation or immigration status, may request residency, which is granted initially for two years, after which they may request permanent residency.

==== Medical training ====
VITEM XV (VICAM) is available for medical doctors to participate in the Mais Médicos medical training program. This visa allows a stay of up to four years, renewable for four more years.

==== Requests for residency while in Brazil ====
Requests for residency with the same purposes and conditions as temporary visas (except VITEM XII and XV) may also be made while the individual is already in Brazil, having entered with a certain visa or exemption but later qualifying for a different or more desirable category. In addition, individuals in various circumstances may also request residency while already in Brazil:

- Former Brazilian nationals (Note: Permanent residency from the start.)
- Refugees, asylum seekers and stateless people
- Unaccompanied minors (Note: Residency is granted until age 18, when the applicant may request permanent residency.)
- Victims of human trafficking, slavery or other criminal abuses of migrants
- Individuals serving a criminal sentence or probation in Brazil (Note: Residency is granted for the duration of the sentence or probation.)
- Nationals of neighboring countries where the Mercosur residency agreement is not in force (Guyana, Suriname and Venezuela) (Note: Residency is granted initially for two years, after which the applicant may request permanent residency.)
- Nationals of Cuba who have participated in the Mais Médicos medical training program
- Nationals of the Dominican Republic and Senegal who have an application for refugee status under review (requires withdrawing the application)

=== Diplomatic, official and courtesy visas ===
Brazil issues diplomatic visas (VIDIP) to representatives of foreign governments or international organizations, as well as official visas (VISOF) to their staff. It also issues courtesy visas (VICOR) to notable people for unofficial trips, to family members and domestic workers of holders of diplomatic or official visas, and to artists and athletes for free cultural events.

=== Accepted travel documents ===
For issuing visitor and temporary visas, Brazil accepts passports of all entities that have diplomatic relations with it (all member states and observer states of the United Nations, and the Order of Malta), as well as Kosovo and Taiwan. If the applicant does not hold any of these passports, the visa is issued on a laissez-passer.

For issuing diplomatic and official visas, Brazil only accepts passports of entities that have diplomatic relations with it.

== Visitor statistics ==
Visitors arriving in Brazil, by country of residence, since 2020
| Country | 2025 | 2024 | 2023 | 2022 | 2021 | 2020 |
|---|---|---|---|---|---|---|
| Argentina | 3,386,823 ▲ | 1,960,182 ▲ | 1,882,240 ▲ | 1,032,762 ▲ | 67,280 ▼ | 887,805 ▼ |
| Chile | 801,921 ▲ | 653,895 ▲ | 458,576 ▲ | 202,470 ▲ | 46,673 ▼ | 131,174 ▼ |
| United States | 759,637 ▲ | 728,537 ▲ | 668,478 ▲ | 441,007 ▲ | 132,182 ▼ | 172,105 ▼ |
| Paraguay | 528,554 ▲ | 465,020 ▲ | 424,460 ▲ | 308,234 ▲ | 132,126 ▲ | 122,981 ▼ |
| Uruguay | 524,729 ▲ | 388,464 ▲ | 334,703 ▲ | 180,064 ▲ | 11,575 ▼ | 113,714 ▼ |
| France | 293,008 ▲ | 235,163 ▲ | 187,559 ▲ | 130,910 ▲ | 34,848 ▼ | 70,369 ▼ |
| Portugal | 273,483 ▲ | 218,354 ▲ | 182,463 ▲ | 149,747 ▲ | 38,704 ▼ | 51,028 ▼ |
| Germany | 209,854 ▲ | 182,166 ▲ | 158,582 ▲ | 120,670 ▲ | 29,514 ▼ | 61,149 ▼ |
| Colombia | 194,467 ▲ | 129,501 ▲ | 118,163 ▲ | 84,470 ▲ | 27,892 ▲ | 27,129 ▼ |
| Italy | 190,342 ▲ | 154,495 ▲ | 129,447 ▲ | 86,766 ▲ | 18,907 ▼ | 45,646 ▼ |
| United Kingdom | 187,396 ▲ | 153,754 ▲ | 130,239 ▲ | 87,909 ▲ | 9,809 ▼ | 48,595 ▼ |
| Peru | 175,418 ▲ | 131,368 ▲ | 99,353 ▲ | 61,634 ▲ | 13,077 ▼ | 33,895 ▼ |
| Venezuela | 169,346 ▲ | 8,637 ▲ | 5,777 ▲ | 3,750 ▲ | 2,499 ▼ | 11,636 ▼ |
| Spain | 160,484 ▲ | 132,484 ▲ | 114,096 ▲ | 83,745 ▲ | 22,828 ▼ | 32,665 ▼ |
| Bolivia | 128,494 ▼ | 129,992 ▲ | 123,803 ▲ | 90,694 ▲ | 26,330 ▼ | 45,449 ▼ |
| Mexico | 121,884 ▲ | 99,137 ▲ | 82,324 ▲ | 52,171 ▲ | 12,731 ▼ | 18,068 ▼ |
| Canada | 103,163 ▲ | 96,540 ▲ | 86,591 ▲ | 54,252 ▲ | 8,077 ▼ | 26,950 ▼ |
| China | 103,122 ▲ | 76,524 ▲ | 42,542 ▲ | 8,787 ▲ | 2,360 ▼ | 6,297 ▼ |
| Japan | 68,719 ▲ | 61,129 ▲ | 42,341 ▲ | 17,635 ▲ | 1,904 ▼ | 20,476 ▼ |
| Netherlands | 64,773 ▲ | 54,273 ▲ | 45,917 ▲ | 35,488 ▲ | 9,080 ▼ | 16,532 ▼ |
| Switzerland | 63,604 ▲ | 58,092 ▲ | 50,359 ▲ | 38,371 ▲ | 13,568 ▼ | 17,063 ▼ |
| Ecuador | 59,060 ▲ | 38,493 ▲ | 33,273 ▲ | 18,971 ▲ | 6,593 ▼ | 7,646 ▼ |
| Australia | 56,308 ▲ | 52,888 ▲ | 46,935 ▲ | 25,825 ▲ | 1,650 ▼ | 17,932 ▼ |
| Ireland | 48,935 ▲ | 42,832 ▲ | 35,983 ▲ | 30,216 ▲ | 4,478 ▼ | 10,419 ▼ |
| Others | 613,672 ▲ | 521,699 ▲ | 424,137 ▲ | 283,483 ▲ | 71,186 ▼ | 149,712 ▼ |
| Total | 9,287,196 ▲ | 6,773,619 ▲ | 5,908,341 ▲ | 3,630,031 ▲ | 745,871 ▼ | 2,146,435 ▼ |

Visitors arriving in Brazil, by country of residence, 2010–2019
| Country | 2019 | 2018 | 2017 | 2016 | 2015 | 2014 | 2013 | 2012 | 2011 | 2010 |
|---|---|---|---|---|---|---|---|---|---|---|
| Argentina | 1,954,725 ▼ | 2,498,483 ▼ | 2,622,327 ▲ | 2,294,900 ▲ | 2,079,823 ▲ | 1,743,930 ▲ | 1,711,491 ▲ | 1,671,604 ▲ | 1,593,775 ▲ | 1,399,592 ▲ |
| United States | 590,520 ▲ | 538,532 ▲ | 475,232 ▼ | 570,350 ▼ | 575,796 ▼ | 656,801 ▲ | 592,827 ▲ | 586,463 ▼ | 594,947 ▼ | 641,377 ▲ |
| Paraguay | 406,526 ▲ | 356,897 ▲ | 336,646 ▲ | 316,714 ▲ | 301,831 ▲ | 293,841 ▲ | 268,932 ▲ | 246,401 ▲ | 192,730 ▼ | 194,340 ▲ |
| Chile | 391,689 ▲ | 387,470 ▲ | 342,143 ▲ | 311,813 ▲ | 306,331 ▼ | 336,950 ▲ | 268,203 ▲ | 250,586 ▲ | 217,200 ▲ | 200,724 ▲ |
| Uruguay | 364,830 ▲ | 348,336 ▲ | 328,098 ▲ | 284,113 ▲ | 267,321 ▲ | 223,508 ▼ | 262,512 ▲ | 253,864 ▼ | 261,204 ▲ | 228,545 ▲ |
| France | 257,504 ▲ | 238,345 ▼ | 254,153 ▼ | 263,774 ▲ | 261,075 ▼ | 282,375 ▲ | 224,078 ▲ | 218,626 ▲ | 207,890 ▲ | 199,719 ▼ |
| Germany | 206,882 ▼ | 209,039 ▲ | 203,045 ▼ | 221,513 ▼ | 224,549 ▼ | 265,498 ▲ | 236,505 ▼ | 258,437 ▲ | 241,739 ▲ | 226,630 ▲ |
| Italy | 182,587 ▲ | 175,763 ▲ | 171,654 ▼ | 181,493 ▼ | 202,015 ▼ | 228,734 ▼ | 233,243 ▲ | 230,114 ▲ | 229,484 ▼ | 245,491 ▼ |
| Portugal | 176,229 ▲ | 145,816 ▲ | 144,095 ▼ | 149,968 ▼ | 162,305 ▼ | 170,066 ▲ | 168,250 ▼ | 168,649 ▼ | 183,728 ▼ | 189,065 ▲ |
| United Kingdom | 163,425 ▲ | 154,586 ▼ | 185,858 ▼ | 202,671 ▲ | 189,269 ▼ | 217,003 ▲ | 169,732 ▲ | 155,548 ▲ | 149,564 ▼ | 167,355 ▼ |
| Spain | 145,325 ▼ | 147,159 ▲ | 137,202 ▼ | 147,846 ▼ | 151,029 ▼ | 166,759 ▼ | 169,751 ▼ | 180,406 ▼ | 190,392 ▲ | 179,340 ▲ |
| Peru | 135,880 ▲ | 121,326 ▲ | 115,320 ▲ | 114,276 ▲ | 113,078 ▼ | 117,230 ▲ | 98,602 ▲ | 91,996 ▲ | 86,795 ▲ | 81,020 ▲ |
| Bolivia | 132,069 ▲ | 126,253 ▼ | 126,781 ▼ | 138,106 ▲ | 108,149 ▲ | 95,300 ▲ | 95,028 ▼ | 112,639 ▲ | 85,429 ▼ | 99,359 ▲ |
| Colombia | 126,595 ▼ | 131,596 ▼ | 140,363 ▲ | 135,192 ▲ | 118,866 ▼ | 158,886 ▲ | 116,461 ▲ | 100,324 ▲ | 91,345 ▲ | 85,567 ▲ |
| Mexico | 82,921 ▲ | 79,891 ▼ | 81,778 ▼ | 94,609 ▲ | 90,361 ▼ | 109,637 ▲ | 76,738 ▲ | 61,658 ▼ | 64,451 ▼ | 67,616 ▼ |
| Japan | 78,914 ▲ | 63,708 ▲ | 60,342 ▼ | 79,754 ▲ | 70,102 ▼ | 84,636 ▼ | 87,225 ▲ | 73,102 ▲ | 63,247 ▲ | 59,742 ▼ |
| Canada | 77,043 ▲ | 71,160 ▲ | 48,951 ▼ | 70,103 ▲ | 68,293 ▼ | 78,531 ▲ | 67,610 ▼ | 68,462 ▼ | 70,358 ▲ | 64,188 ▲ |
| China | 68,578 ▲ | 56,333 ▼ | 61,250 ▲ | 57,860 ▲ | 53,064 ▼ | 57,502 ▼ | 60,140 ▼ | 65,945 ▲ | 55,978 ▲ | 37,849 ▲ |
| Switzerland | 63,826 ▼ | 70,040 ▲ | 69,484 ▲ | 69,074 ▼ | 70,319 ▼ | 80,277 ▲ | 68,390 ▼ | 69,571 ▲ | 65,951 ▼ | 69,995 ▼ |
| Netherlands | 59,752 ▼ | 62,651 ▲ | 59,272 ▼ | 72,268 ▲ | 66,870 ▼ | 81,655 ▲ | 69,187 ▼ | 73,133 ▲ | 72,162 ▼ | 76,411 ▲ |
| Australia | 56,158 ▲ | 42,235 ▲ | 33,862 ▼ | 49,809 ▲ | 44,896 ▼ | 67,389 ▲ | 45,079 ▲ | 43,161 ▲ | 35,642 ▼ | 36,846 ▼ |
| Venezuela | 40,160 ▼ | 40,761 ▼ | 53,950 ▼ | 61,160 ▼ | 80,488 ▼ | 108,170 ▲ | 68,309 ▲ | 51,106 ▼ | 57,261 ▲ | 51,186 ▼ |
| Others | 591,003 ▲ | 554,996 ▲ | 536,964 ▼ | 659,330 ▼ | 700,008 ▼ | 805,174 ▲ | 655,049 ▲ | 645,048 ▲ | 622,082 ▲ | 559,422 ▲ |
| Total | 6,353,141 ▼ | 6,621,376 ▲ | 6,588,770 ▲ | 6,546,696 ▲ | 6,305,838 ▼ | 6,429,852 ▲ | 5,813,342 ▲ | 5,676,843 ▲ | 5,433,354 ▲ | 5,161,379 ▲ |

Visitors arriving in Brazil, by country of residence, 2000–2009
| Country | 2009 | 2008 | 2007 | 2006 | 2005 | 2004 | 2003 | 2002 | 2001 | 2000 |
|---|---|---|---|---|---|---|---|---|---|---|
| Argentina | 1,211,159 ▲ | 1,017,675 ▲ | 921,679 ▼ | 933,061 ▼ | 992,299 ▲ | 922,484 ▲ | 786,568 ▲ | 698,465 ▼ | 1,374,461 ▼ | 1,744,004 ▲ |
| United States | 603,674 ▼ | 625,506 ▼ | 695,749 ▼ | 721,633 ▼ | 793,559 ▲ | 705,993 ▲ | 668,668 ▲ | 628,412 ▲ | 596,844 ▼ | 648,026 ▲ |
| Italy | 253,545 ▼ | 265,724 ▼ | 268,685 ▼ | 287,898 ▼ | 303,878 ▲ | 276,563 ▲ | 221,190 ▲ | 197,641 ▼ | 216,038 ▲ | 202,903 ▲ |
| Germany | 215,595 ▼ | 254,264 ▼ | 257,740 ▼ | 277,182 ▼ | 308,598 ▲ | 294,989 ▲ | 283,615 ▲ | 268,903 ▼ | 320,050 ▲ | 290,335 ▲ |
| France | 205,860 ▼ | 214,440 ▼ | 254,367 ▼ | 275,913 ▲ | 263,829 ▲ | 224,160 ▲ | 211,347 ▲ | 199,613 ▲ | 184,759 ▲ | 165,117 ▲ |
| Uruguay | 189,412 ▼ | 199,403 ▼ | 226,111 ▼ | 255,349 ▼ | 341,647 ▲ | 309,732 ▲ | 270,251 ▲ | 195,384 ▼ | 304,682 ▼ | 403,896 ▲ |
| Portugal | 183,697 ▼ | 222,558 ▼ | 280,438 ▼ | 299,211 ▼ | 357,640 ▲ | 336,988 ▲ | 229,594 ▲ | 203,126 ▲ | 165,898 ▲ | 147,143 ▲ |
| Paraguay | 180,373 ▼ | 217,709 ▲ | 212,022 ▲ | 198,958 ▼ | 249,030 ▲ | 204,762 ▲ | 198,170 ▼ | 226,011 ▼ | 285,724 ▼ | 371,873 ▼ |
| Spain | 174,526 ▼ | 202,624 ▼ | 216,891 ▲ | 211,741 ▲ | 172,979 ▲ | 155,421 ▲ | 122,641 ▲ | 114,050 ▼ | 126,928 ▲ | 110,765 ▲ |
| United Kingdom | 172,643 ▼ | 181,179 ▲ | 176,970 ▲ | 169,627 ▲ | 169,514 ▲ | 150,336 ▲ | 138,281 ▲ | 137,049 ▼ | 143,626 ▲ | 127,903 ▲ |
| Chile | 170,491 ▼ | 240,087 ▼ | 260,439 ▲ | 176,357 ▲ | 169,953 ▲ | 155,026 ▲ | 126,591 ▲ | 113,507 ▼ | 153,921 ▼ | 172,807 ▲ |
| Bolivia | 83,454 ▼ | 84,072 ▲ | 61,990 ▲ | 55,169 ▼ | 68,670 ▲ | 60,239 ▲ | 54,865 ▼ | 57,878 ▼ | 107,664 ▼ | 134,640 ▼ |
| Peru | 78,975 ▼ | 93,693 ▼ | 96,336 ▲ | 64,002 ▲ | 60,251 ▲ | 56,647 ▲ | 38,948 ▼ | 39,723 ▼ | 48,405 ▼ | 51,627 ▲ |
| Colombia | 78,010 ▼ | 96,846 ▲ | 45,838 ▼ | 50,103 ▲ | 47,230 ▲ | 42,163 ▲ | 36,283 ▼ | 38,828 ▼ | 50,335 ▲ | 50,065 ▲ |
| Netherlands | 75,518 ▼ | 81,936 ▼ | 83,566 ▼ | 86,122 ▼ | 109,708 ▲ | 102,480 ▲ | 83,999 ▲ | 62,331 ▲ | 44,057 ▲ | 42,428 ▼ |
| Switzerland | 72,736 ▲ | 61,169 ▼ | 72,763 ▼ | 84,816 ▼ | 89,789 ▲ | 83,113 ▲ | 69,644 ▲ | 62,842 ▼ | 71,562 ▲ | 67,947 ▼ |
| Mexico | 68,028 ▼ | 77,193 ▲ | 58,804 ▼ | 70,862 ▼ | 73,118 ▲ | 65,707 ▲ | 55,556 ▲ | 48,896 ▲ | 40,765 ▼ | 41,328 ▲ |
| Japan | 66,655 ▼ | 81,270 ▲ | 63,381 ▼ | 74,638 ▲ | 68,066 ▲ | 60,806 ▲ | 51,387 ▲ | 42,829 ▼ | 43,397 ▲ | 40,905 ▼ |
| Canada | 63,296 ▲ | 62,681 ▼ | 63,983 ▲ | 62,603 ▼ | 75,100 ▲ | 66,895 ▲ | 63,183 ▲ | 62,721 ▲ | 55,629 ▲ | 54,916 ▲ |
| Venezuela | 53,886 ▼ | 62,622 ▲ | 46,019 ▼ | 50,471 ▲ | 48,598 ▲ | 44,257 ▲ | 39,234 ▼ | 42,088 ▼ | 49,761 ▼ | 52,929 ▼ |
| Others | 600,684 ▼ | 707,448 ▲ | 662,063 ▲ | 611,535 ▲ | 594,714 ▲ | 474,942 ▲ | 382,832 ▲ | 344,601 ▼ | 388,069 ▼ | 391,906 ▼ |
| Total | 4,802,217 ▼ | 5,050,099 ▲ | 5,025,834 ▲ | 5,017,251 ▼ | 5,358,170 ▲ | 4,793,703 ▲ | 4,132,847 ▲ | 3,784,898 ▼ | 4,772,575 ▼ | 5,313,463 ▲ |

Visitors arriving in Brazil, by country of residence, 1989–1999
| Country | 1999 | 1998 | 1997 | 1996 | 1995 | 1994 | 1993 | 1992 | 1991 | 1990 | 1989 |
|---|---|---|---|---|---|---|---|---|---|---|---|
| Argentina | 1,548,570 | 1,467,922 | 938,973 | 858,189 | 657,943 | 787,117 | 794,766 | 598,344 | 405,334 | 263,606 | 449,544 |
| United States | 559,366 | 524,093 | 402,200 | 356,000 | 224,577 | 164,209 | 91,471 | 117,801 | 112,421 | 120,313 | 146,194 |
| Paraguay | 501,425 | 451,517 | 146,649 | 118,563 | 90,716 | 93,728 | 77,968 | 71,876 | 68,848 | 65,127 | 83,928 |
| Uruguay | 383,750 | 358,836 | 206,468 | 209,334 | 200,423 | 157,327 | 150,087 | 153,666 | 112,041 | 99,685 | 146,252 |
| Germany | 282,846 | 262,734 | 140,578 | 141,562 | 102,106 | 81,623 | 54,993 | 63,769 | 55,683 | 62,311 | 69,485 |
| Italy | 177,589 | 168,725 | 123,115 | 109,836 | 84,001 | 71,869 | 58,637 | 69,034 | 58,537 | 58,644 | 58,446 |
| Chile | 170,564 | 159,673 | 92,233 | 87,153 | 63,900 | 46,058 | 29,640 | 28,037 | 26,423 | 26,260 | 27,643 |
| Bolivia | 145,072 | 150,242 | 41,923 | 37,085 | 20,737 | 24,237 | 23,873 | 27,000 | 26,547 | 26,078 | 36,898 |
| France | 131,978 | 121,190 | 84,552 | 75,277 | 55,252 | 41,796 | 32,788 | 37,443 | 35,222 | 39,108 | 45,052 |
| United Kingdom | 125,607 | 118,339 | 62,309 | 58,199 | 38,532 | 29,949 | 18,974 | 24,691 | 24,006 | 25,416 | 25,480 |
| Portugal | 115,088 | 105,628 | 63,315 | 62,644 | 52,179 | 43,652 | 30,352 | 30,014 | 25,627 | 20,637 | 20,796 |
| Spain | 99,677 | 92,020 | 63,809 | 65,147 | 59,503 | 47,906 | 35,117 | 42,774 | 38,539 | 42,906 | 46,684 |
| Switzerland | 71,677 | 66,522 | 46,540 | 48,596 | 33,505 | 26,277 | 20,020 | 23,258 | 24,518 | 26,048 | 28,322 |
| Venezuela | 58,980 | 59,826 | 27,820 | 37,460 | 29,490 | 16,916 | 7,336 | 10,520 | 10,090 | 9,448 | 10,223 |
| Netherlands | 56,731 | 54,018 | 31,320 | 30,128 | 20,851 | 17,032 | 11,309 | 13,247 | 11,582 | 12,043 | 12,391 |
| Canada | 49,350 | 46,986 | 29,278 | 26,306 | 16,706 | 12,086 | 8,664 | 10,774 | 11,880 | 14,905 | 17,193 |
| Peru | 48,564 | 48,871 | 28,765 | 21,309 | 14,997 | 14,939 | 11,333 | 14,196 | 12,546 | 11,647 | 12,121 |
| Colombia | 48,530 | 49,281 | 22,561 | 19,286 | 13,484 | 9,822 | 6,272 | 8,061 | 7,351 | 8,561 | 10,290 |
| Japan | 41,814 | 38,140 | 39,194 | 48,474 | 30,219 | 21,667 | 13,081 | 17,862 | 16,057 | 20,564 | 22,553 |
| Mexico | 39,093 | 36,773 | 28,075 | 23,959 | 13,283 | 11,846 | 7,656 | 10,674 | 9,859 | 11,373 | 13,090 |
| Others | 450,898 | 436,748 | 230,072 | 231,001 | 169,012 | 133,245 | 87,603 | 101,817 | 98,787 | 126,385 | 120,297 |
| Total | 5,107,169 | 4,818,084 | 2,849,749 | 2,665,508 | 1,991,416 | 1,853,301 | 1,571,940 | 1,474,858 | 1,191,898 | 1,091,065 | 1,402,882 |

== See also ==
- Visa requirements for Brazilian citizens
