= Visa requirements for Portuguese citizens =

Administrative entry restrictions

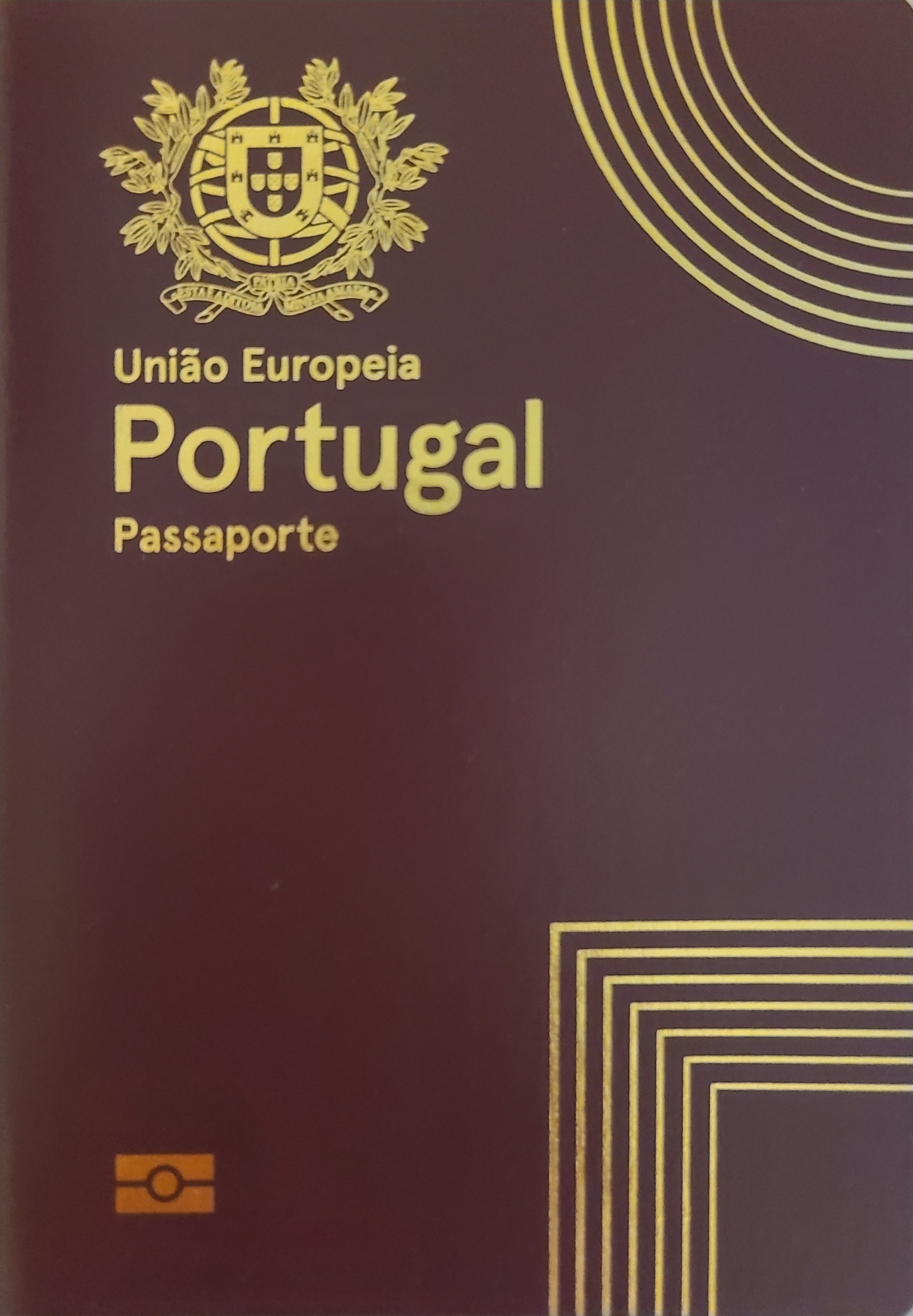
A Portuguese passport

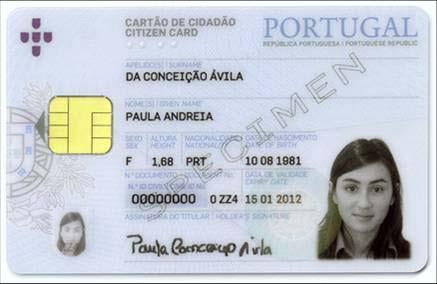
A Portuguese Idenitity card is valid for travel to most European countries

Visa requirements for Portuguese citizens are administrative entry restrictions by the authorities of other states placed on citizens of Portugal.

As of 2026, Portuguese citizens have visa-free or visa on arrival access to 184 countries and territories, ranking the Portuguese passport 5th in the world according to the Henley Passport Index.

== Visa requirements map ==
Visa requirements for Portuguese citizens holding ordinary passports Portugal Freedom of movement Visa not required / ETA (Note: ETA required for Australia, Canada if arriving by air, Israel, Kenya, New Zealand, Saint Kitts and Nevis, Seychelles, United Kingdom and the United States) (Note: Including Australian eVisitor.) Visa on arrival eVisa Visa available both on arrival or online (Note: Including Indonesian e-VOA.) Visa required prior to arrival

== Visa requirements ==
Country	Visa requirement	Allowed stay	Notes (excluding departure fees)	Reciprocity
Afghanistan	eVisa	30 days	Visa is not required in case born in Afghanistan or can proof that one of their parents is a national of Afghanistan or born in Afghanistan.; e-Visa : Visitors must arrive at Kabul International (KBL).	✓
Albania	Visa not required	90 days	Identity card valid.	✓
Algeria	Visa required			✓
Andorra	Visa not required		Identity card valid.; Under bilateral agreement, there is a simplified procedure in place for obtaining residence and work permits.	✓
Angola	Visa not required	30 days	30 days per single entry, maximum 90 days per year.; International Certificate of Vaccination required	X
Antigua and Barbuda	Visa not required	6 months		✓
Argentina	Visa not required	90 days		✓
Armenia	Visa not required	180 days		X
Australia	eVisitor	90 days	ETA is also Available for Portuguese Citizens.; 90 days on each visit in 12-month period if granted.; Transit through Australia for less than 8 hours a travel permit eVisitor or ETA is not required.; May enter using SmartGate.	✓
Austria	Freedom of movement		Identity card valid.	✓
Azerbaijan	eVisa	30 days		X
Bahamas	Visa not required	3 months		✓
Bahrain	eVisa / Visa on arrival	14 days		X
Bangladesh	Visa on arrival	30 days	Not available at all entry points.	X
Barbados	Visa not required	3 months		✓
Belarus	Visa not required	30 days	Visa-free until 31 December 2026.	X
Belgium	Freedom of movement		Identity card valid.	✓
Belize	Visa not required			X
Benin	eVisa	30 days	Must have an international vaccination certificate.	X
Bhutan	eVisa		Pre-approved visa can be picked up on arrival.	✓
Bolivia	Visa not required	90 days		X
Bosnia and Herzegovina	Visa not required	90 days	90 days within 6-month period.; Identity card valid.	✓
Botswana	Visa not required	90 days	90 days within year period.	X
Brazil	Visa not required	90 days	Portuguese citizens benefiting from equal citizenship status are eligible for regular Brazilian identity cards. They enjoy a reciprocal special regimen in recognition of Brazil and Portugal's special relationship.; the Portuguese people have a special status in Brazil Due to a treaty, citizens of Portugal permanently residing in Brazil may request equal civil rights, and after three years of residence also political rights, such as voting and being elected, as if they were naturalized citizens of Brazil.; Extension of stay is possible.	✓
Brunei	Visa not required	90 days		✓
Bulgaria	Freedom of movement		Identity card valid	✓
Burkina Faso	eVisa	1 month		X
Burundi	Online visa / Visa on arrival	1 month	Portuguese Citizens can now obtain a visa on arrival at Bujumbura International Airport and all land borders.	X
Cambodia	eVisa / Visa on arrival	30 days	Visa is also obtainable online.	X
Cameroon	eVisa		Pre-approved visa can be picked up on arrival.	✓
Canada	eTA	6 months	eTA required if arriving by air.	✓
Cape Verde	Visa not required	30 days	Must register online at least five days prior to arrival.	X
Central African Republic	Visa required			✓
Chad	eVisa	90 days	Must apply at least 7 days before arrival but maximum 90 days before arrival.	X
Chile	Visa not required	90 days		✓
China	Visa not required	30 days	Visa-free from 15 October 2024 to 31 December 2026.; 240-hour (10-day) visa-free transit to a third country or region (including Hong Kong, Macau or Taiwan) using any mode of transport. Must have a confirmed onward ticket/itinerary, and enter through 1 of 64 approved ports.; During which, may freely travel within the 24 provinces permitted for visa-free transit and engage in tourism, business, and visits.; 24-hour visa-free transit to a third country or region (including Hong Kong, Macau, and Taiwan), is available at most international airports, without leaving the airport.; Travellers who need to leave the airport may obtain a temporary entry permit from immigration.; 5-day port visa (Visa on Arrival) for Shenzhen if arriving at designated ports of entry from Hong Kong by land or sea, for stays within Shenzhen.; 3-day port visa (Visa on Arrival) if arriving in Zhuhai or Xiamen at designated ports of entry, for stays within the respective city.; 15-day visa-free entry for cruise ship passengers in tour groups, if arriving at any cruise port along China's coastline, including but not limited to Tianjin; Dalian; Shanghai; Lianyungang; Wenzhou; Zhoushan; Xiamen; Qingdao; Guangzhou; Shenzhen; Beihai; Haikou; Sanya. May further travel inland to all regions of coastal provinces (and equivalents) and Beijing.; May apply for a port visa (Visa on Arrival) if travelling for an urgent, qualified reason. Prior clearance for port visa is highly recommended or may be denied boarding by airlines.	X
Colombia	Visa not required	90 days	90 days – extendable up to 180-days stay within a one-year period.	✓
Comoros	Visa on arrival	45 days		X
Republic of the Congo	Visa required			✓
Democratic Republic of the Congo	eVisa	7 days		✓
Costa Rica	Visa not required	90 days		✓
Côte d'Ivoire	eVisa	3 months	e-Visa holders must arrive via Port Bouet Airport.	X
Croatia	Freedom of movement		Identity card valid.	✓
Cuba	eVisa	90 days	Can be extended up to 90 days with a fee.	X
Cyprus	Freedom of movement		Identity card valid.	✓
Czech Republic	Freedom of movement		Identity card valid.	✓
Denmark	Freedom of movement		Identity card valid.	✓
Djibouti	eVisa	90 days		X
Dominica	Visa not required	90 days	90 days within any 180 day period	✓
Dominican Republic	Visa not required	90 days		X
Ecuador	Visa not required	90 days		X
Egypt	eVisa / Visa on arrival	30 days	Identity card valid	X
El Salvador	Visa not required	3 months		✓
Equatorial Guinea	eVisa			✓
Eritrea	Visa required		Pre-approved visa can be picked up on arrival.	✓
Estonia	Freedom of movement		Identity card valid.	✓
Eswatini	Visa not required	30 days		X
Ethiopia	eVisa / Visa on arrival	up to 90 days	Visa on arrival is obtainable only at Addis Ababa Bole International Airport.; e-Visa holders must arrive via Addis Ababa Bole International Airport.; e-Visa is available for 30 or 90 days.	X
Fiji	Visa not required	4 months		X
Finland	Freedom of movement		Identity card valid	✓
France	Freedom of movement		Identity card valid	✓
Gabon	eVisa	90 days	e-Visa holders must arrive via Libreville International Airport.	X
Gambia	Visa not required	90 days		X
Georgia	Visa not required	1 year	Identity card valid	✓
Germany	Freedom of movement		Identity card valid	✓
Ghana	Visa required		Pre-approved visa can be picked up on arrival.	✓
Greece	Freedom of movement		Identity card valid	✓
Grenada	Visa not required	3 months		✓
Guatemala	Visa not required	90 days		✓
Guinea	eVisa	90 days		X
Guinea-Bissau	Visa on arrival	90 days		X
Guyana	Visa not required	90 days		X
Haiti	Visa not required	90 days		X
Honduras	Visa not required	3 months		✓
Hungary	Freedom of movement		Identity card valid	✓
Iceland	Freedom of movement		Identity card valid	✓
India	eVisa	30 days	e-Visa holders must arrive via 32 designated airports (Note: Ahmedabad; Amritsar; Bagdogra; Bengaluru; Bhubaneswar; Chandigarh; Chennai; Coimbatore; Delhi; Gaya; Goa-Dabolim; Goa-Manohar; Guwahati; Hyderabad; Indore; Jaipur; Kannur; Kochi; Kolkata; Kozhikode; Lucknow; Madurai; Mangaluru; Mumbai; Nagpur; Port Blair; Pune; Surat; Thiruvananthapuram; Tiruchirappalli; Varanasi; Visakhapatnam) or 5 designated seaports. (Note: Chennai; Cochin; Mormugao (Goa); Mumbai; Mangalore); An Indian e-Tourist Visa may only be obtained twice within 1 calendar year.; Foreigners of Pakistani origin or who hold a Pakistani Passport are not eligible for an e-Visa. Foreigners who are not Pakistani nationals, but whose parents or grandparents (either paternal or maternal) were born in, or were permanent residents in Pakistan, are also not eligible for an e-Visa.	X
Indonesia	e-VOA / Visa on arrival	30 days		X
Iran	eVisa	30 days	Passengers who have already made an application, at least two days before arrival, at the Iranian Ministry of Foreign Affair's e-Visa website and present the submission notification at the airport's visa desk may obtain a visa on arrival.; Women will be refused entry if not wearing Islamic head cover, scarf, long sleeves or stockings.	X
Iraq	eVisa	60 days	Visa on arrival or eVisa for up to 30 days for travel to Iraqi Kurdistan.	X
Ireland	Freedom of movement		Identity card valid.	✓
Israel	ETA-IL	3 months	Starting 1 July 2024, the ETA-IL (Electronic Travel Authorisation) will open for application submissions.	✓
Italy	Freedom of movement		Identity card valid.	✓
Jamaica	Visa not required	30 days		X
Japan	Visa not required	90 days		✓
Jordan	eVisa / Visa on arrival		Visa can be obtained upon arrival, it will cost a total of 40 JOD, obtainable at most international ports of entry and land border crossings (except King Hussein/Allenby Bridge)	X
Kazakhstan	Visa not required	30 days		X
Kenya	Electronic Travel Authorisation	3 months	Applications can be submitted up to 90 days prior to travel and must be submitted at least 3 days in advance.; eTA fee is 32.50 USD.; Proof of reservation at the hotel where visitors plan to stay is required (if staying with friends, an invitation letter is also acceptable).; Yellow fever vaccination certificate is required if coming from endemic countries.	X
Kiribati	Visa not required	90 days	90 days within any 180 day period.	✓
North Korea	Visa required			✓
South Korea	Visa not required	90 days	Portuguese are exempt from K-ETA until 31 December 2025.; The validity period of a K-ETA is 3 years from the date of approval.	✓
Kuwait	eVisa / Visa on arrival	3 months		X
Kyrgyzstan	Visa not required	60 days		X
Laos	eVisa / Visa on arrival	30 days	18 (Note: Savannakhet Airport; Lanetoui - Mengkang (China); Meuangmom - Wan Pong (Myanmar); Banvang - Ban Khok Phai (Thailand); Namngeun - Huay Kon (Thailand); Paksan - Bueng Kan (Thailand); Paktaphan - Pak Saeng (Thailand); Pangmon - Ban Huak (Thailand); Phoudou (Thailand); Dak ta ock - Nam Giang (Vietnam); La Lai (Vietnam); Namkan (Vietnam); Namphao - Cau Treo (Vietnam); Namsoy - Na Meo (Vietnam); Naphao - Cha Lo (Vietnam); Pahang - Long Sap (Vietnam); Panghok - Tây Trang (Vietnam); Phoukeua - Bo Y (Vietnam)) of the 33 border crossings are only open to regular visa holders.; e-Visa may be used to enter Laos through the Luang Prabang, Pakse and Vientiane international airports, 3 Thai-Lao Friendship Bridges (Note: Vientiane (Friendship Bridge 1); Savannakhet (Friendship Bridge 2); Bokeo (Friendship Bridge 4)), in Boten (road and railroad), and in Vientiane (at Khamsavath railway station).; Visa on arrival is available at the Luang Prabang, Pakse and Vientiane international airports, 4 Thai-Lao Friendship Bridges (Note: Vientiane (Friendship Bridge 1); Savannakhet (Friendship Bridge 2); Khammouane (Friendship Bridge 3); Bokeo (Friendship Bridge 4)) and 7 border crossings. (Note: Nongnokkheane - Trapeang Kriel (Cambodia); Boten - Bo han (China); Golden Triangle/Samliemkham (Thailand); Khamsavath railway station (Thailand); Namheuang - Ban Na Kraseng (Thailand); Vang tao - Chongmek (Thailand); Dansavan - Lao Bảo (Vietnam))	X
Latvia	Freedom of movement		Identity card valid.	✓
Lebanon	Free visa on arrival	1 month	Extendable for 2 additional months; Granted free of charge at Beirut International Airport or any other port of entry if there is no Israeli visa or seal, holding a telephone number, an address in Lebanon, and a non refundable return or circle trip ticket.	X
Lesotho	Visa not required	14 days		X
Liberia	eVisa	90 days	The Liberia Visa on Arrival (VoA) allows travelers to obtain a Visa upon arrival in Liberia by plane. Travelers must pre-apply for the visa online.	✓
Libya	eVisa			✓
Liechtenstein	Freedom of movement		Identity card valid.	✓
Lithuania	Freedom of movement		Identity card valid.	✓
Luxembourg	Freedom of movement		Identity card valid.	✓
Madagascar	eVisa/Visa on arrival	60 days		X
Malawi	eVisa / Visa on arrival	30 days		X
Malaysia	Visa not required	90 days		✓
Maldives	Free visa on arrival	30 days		X
Mali	Visa required			✓
Malta	Freedom of movement		Identity card valid	✓
Marshall Islands	Visa not required	90 days	90 days within any 180 day period	✓
Mauritania	eVisa	30 days	An eVisa is mandatory before travel.	X
Mauritius	Visa not required	90 days		✓
Mexico	Visa not required	180 days		✓
Micronesia	Visa not required	90 days	90 days within any 180 day period.	✓
Moldova	Visa not required	90 days	90 days within any 180 day period.; Identity card valid.	✓
Monaco	Visa not required		Identity card valid	✓
Mongolia	Visa not required	30 days	The Ministry of Foreign Affairs of Mongolia has exempted visas for 34 countries from January 2023 to December 2026.	X
Montenegro	Visa not required	90 days	Identity card valid for 30 days.	✓
Morocco	Visa not required	3 months		X
Mozambique	Visa not required	30 days	Travelers must register on the e-Visa platform at least 48 hours prior to travel and pay a processing fee of 650 MT.	X
Myanmar	eVisa	28 days	e-Visa holders must arrive via Yangon, Nay Pyi Taw or Mandalay airports or via land border crossings with Thailand — Tachileik, Myawaddy and Kawthaung or India — Rih Khaw Dar and Tamu.; e-Visa available for both tourism (allowed stay is 28 days) or business (allowed stay is 70 days) purposes.	X
Namibia	eVisa / Visa on arrival	90 days	Can be obtained online or on arrival for a fee of N$1,600 (approximately €82 / US$88).	X
Nauru	Visa required			✓
Nepal	Online Visa / Visa on arrival	90 days	Not available at all entry points.	X
Netherlands	Freedom of movement		Identity card valid.	✓
New Zealand	Electronic Travel Authority	3 months	May enter using eGate.; Portuguese passport holders must also have the right to live permanently in Portugal, otherwise a visa is required.; International Visitor Conservation and Tourism Levy must be paid upon requesting an Electronic Travel Authority.; Holders of an Australian Permanent Resident Visa or Resident Return Visa may be granted a New Zealand Resident Visa on arrival permitting indefinite stay (pursuant to the Trans-Tasman Travel Arrangement), subject to meeting character requirements and obtaining an Electronic Travel Authority prior to departure. Such travellers are not required to pay the International Visitor Conservation and Tourism Levy.	✓
Nicaragua	Visa not required	90 days		✓
Niger	Visa required			✓
Nigeria	eVisa	90 days	Pre-approved visa can be picked up on arrival.	✓
North Macedonia	Visa not required	90 days	Identity card valid	✓
Norway	Freedom of movement		Identity card valid	✓
Oman	Visa not required	14 days	e-Visa valid for 30 days is also available.; Holders of diplomatic or official passports is up to 90 days.	X
Pakistan	eVisa	90 days		X
Palau	Visa not required	90 days	90 days within any 180 day period.	✓
Panama	Visa not required	90 days		✓
Papua New Guinea	eVisa	60 days	Available at Gurney Airport (Alotau), Mount Hagen Airport, Port Moresby Airport and Tokua Airport (Rabaul).	X
Paraguay	Visa not required	90 days		✓
Peru	Visa not required	90 days	90 days within any 180-day period.	✓
Philippines	Visa not required	30 days		X
Poland	Freedom of movement		Identity card valid.	✓
Qatar	Visa not required	90 days		X
Romania	Freedom of movement		Identity card valid.	✓
Russia	eVisa	30 days		X
Rwanda	eVisa / Visa on arrival	30 days		X
Saint Kitts and Nevis	Electronic Travel Authorisation	3 months		✓
Saint Lucia	Visa not required	90 days	90 days within any 180 day period	✓
Saint Vincent and the Grenadines	Visa not required	90 days	90 days within any 180 day period	✓
Samoa	Visa not required	90 days	90 days within any 180 day period	✓
San Marino	Visa not required		Identity card valid	✓
São Tomé and Príncipe	Visa not required	15 days		X
Saudi Arabia	eVisa / Visa on arrival	90 days		X
Senegal	Visa not required	90 days		X
Serbia	Visa not required	90 days	90 days within any 6-month period.; Identity card valid.	✓
Seychelles	ETA	90 days	Travelers must obtain an ETA before departure.	✓
Sierra Leone	eVisa / Visa on arrival	3 months / 30 days		X
Singapore	Visa not required	90 days		✓
Slovakia	Freedom of movement		Identity card valid.	✓
Slovenia	Freedom of movement		Identity card valid.	✓
Solomon Islands	Visa not required	90 days	90 days within any 180 day period.	✓
Somalia	eVisa		Available at Berbera, Borama, Burao, Erigavo and Hargeisa airports.; 30 days, available at Bosaso Airport, Galcaio Airport and Mogadishu Airport.	X
South Africa	Visa not required	90 days		X
South Sudan	eVisa		Obtainable online.; Printed visa authorization must be presented at the time of travel.	X
Spain	Freedom of movement		Identity card valid	✓
Sri Lanka	eVisa / Visa on arrival	60 days / 30 days	Sri Lanka introduced an ETA valid for 30 days.	X
Sudan	Visa required			✓
Suriname	Visa not required	90 days	An entrance fee of USD 50 or EUR 50 must be paid online prior to arrival.; Multiple entry e-Visa is also available.	X
Sweden	Freedom of movement		Identity card valid	✓
Switzerland	Freedom of movement		Identity card valid	✓
Syria	eVisa			X
Tajikistan	Visa not required	30 days	e-Visa is also available online for a maximum stay of 60 days within 90 days.; e-Visa holders can enter through all border points.	X
Tanzania	eVisa / Visa on arrival	90 days		X
Thailand	Visa not required	60 days	Maximum two visits annually if not arriving by air.	X
Timor-Leste	Visa not required	90 days	90 days within any 180 day period.	✓
Togo	eVisa	15 days		X
Tonga	Visa not required	90 days	90 days within any 180 day period.	✓
Trinidad and Tobago	Visa not required	90 days	90 days within any 180 day period.	✓
Tunisia	Visa not required	3 months		X
Turkey	Visa not required	90 days	90 days within any 180 day period.; Identity card valid.	X
Turkmenistan	Visa required		Pre-approved visa can be picked up on arrival.	✓
Tuvalu	Visa not required	90 days	90 days within any 180 day period.	✓
Uganda	eVisa	3 months	Determined at the port of entry.	X
Ukraine	Visa not required	90 days	90 days within any 180 day period.	✓
United Arab Emirates	Visa not required	90 days	90 days within any 180-day period.	✓
United Kingdom	Electronic Travel Authorisation	6 months	ETA UK (valid for 2 years when issued) required from 2 April 2025.; May enter using ePassport gates.	✓
United States	Visa Waiver Program	90 days	ESTA is valid for 2 years from the date of issuance.; ESTA is also required when entering the country by cruise ship or land.; A Form I-94 is required for entry into the United States by land. It carries a $30 fee and can be obtained either online or upon arrival.; Visa required for nationals of VWP countries who have travelled or been present in Iran, Iraq, Libya, North Korea, Somalia, Sudan, Syria or Yemen at any time on or after 1 March 2011 or Cuba at any time on or after 12 January 2021, or nationals of VWP countries who are also nationals of Iran, Iraq, North Korea, Sudan or Syria. Exceptions apply if the travel was in military or diplomatic service of the VWP country.	✓
Uruguay	Visa not required	90 days		✓
Uzbekistan	Visa not required	30 days		X
Vanuatu	Visa not required	120 days		✓
Vatican City	Visa not required		Identity card valid.	✓
Venezuela	Visa not required	90 days		✓
Vietnam	eVisa	90 days	e-Visa is valid for 90 days and multiple entry.; Phú Quốc visa exemption for up to 30 days.	X
Yemen	Visa required			✓
Zambia	Visa not required	90 days	Also eligible for a universal visa allowing access to Zimbabwe.	X
Zimbabwe	eVisa / Visa on arrival	90 days	Strictly tourism purposes only.; Also eligible for a universal visa allowing access to Zambia.	X

== Territories and disputed areas ==
Visa requirements for Portuguese citizens for visits to various territories, disputed areas, partially recognized countries and restricted zones:

Visitor to	Visa requirement	Notes (excluding departure fees)
Europe
Abkhazia	Visa required	
Mount Athos	Special permit required	Special permit required (4 days: 25 euro for Orthodox visitors, 35 euro for non-Orthodox visitors, 18 euro for students). There is a visitors' quota: maximum 100 Orthodox and 10 non-Orthodox per day and women are not allowed.
(Belarus) Brest and Grodno	Visa not required	Visa-free for 10 days
Northern Cyprus	Visa not required	3 months; Identity card valid.
(United Nations) UN Buffer Zone in Cyprus	Access Permit required	Access Permit is required for travelling inside the zone, except Civil Use Areas.
Faroe Islands	Visa not required	Identity card valid.
Gibraltar	Visa not required	Identity card valid.
Guernsey	Visa not required	
(Guernsey) Alderney	Visa not required.	
(Guernsey) Sark	Visa not required.	
Isle of Man	Visa not required	
(Norway) Jan Mayen	Permit required	Permit issued by the local police required for staying for less than 24 hours and permit issued by the Norwegian police for staying for more than 24 hours.
Jersey	Visa not required	
Kosovo	Visa not required	90 days: Identity card valid.
Russia	Special authorization required	Several closed cities and regions in Russia require special authorization.
South Ossetia	Visa not required	Multiple entry visa to Russia and three-day prior notification are required to enter South Ossetia.
Svalbard	Visa not required	Unlimited period under Svalbard Treaty: Identity card valid.
Transnistria	Visa not required	Registration required after 24h.
Africa
British Indian Ocean Territory	Special permit required	Special permit required.
Eritrea outside Asmara	Travel permit required	To travel in the rest of the country, a Travel Permit for Foreigners is required (20 Eritrean nakfa).
Mayotte	Freedom of movement	Identity card valid.
Réunion	Freedom of movement	Identity card valid.
Canary Islands	Freedom of movement	Identity card valid.
Ceuta	Freedom of movement	Identity card valid.
Melilla	Freedom of movement	Identity card valid.
(Portugal) Madeira	Freedom of movement	Unlimited Stay in Portugal Territory, the Portuguese Citizens Permanently have the right to live and work freely in Madeira.: Savage Islands are also Portugal Territory Zone.
Ascension Island	eVisa	3 months within any year period
Saint Helena	Visitor's Pass required	Visitor's Pass granted on arrival valid for 4/10/21/60/90 days for 12/14/16/20/25 pound sterling.
Tristan da Cunha	Permission required	Permission to land required for 15/30 pounds sterling (yacht/ship passenger) for Tristan da Cunha Island or 20 pounds sterling for Gough Island, Inaccessible Island or Nightingale Islands.
Sahrawi Arab Democratic Republic		Undefined visa regime in the Western Sahara controlled territory.
Somaliland	Visa on arrival	30 days for 30 US dollars, payable on arrival.
Sudan	Travel permit required	All foreigners traveling more than 25 kilometers outside of Khartoum must obtain a travel permit.
(Sudan) Darfur	Travel permit required	Separate travel permit is required.
Asia
(China) Hainan	Visa not required	Visa not required for 30 days with an invitation letter from an accredited local tour agency, or present a confirmed hotel reservation and return/onward ticket before immigration.
Hong Kong	Visa not required	90 days
India PAP/RAP	PAP/RAP required	Protected Area Permit (PAP) required for all of Arunachal Pradesh, Manipur, Mizoram and parts of Himachal Pradesh, Jammu and Kashmir and Uttarakhand. Restricted Area Permit (RAP) required for all of Andaman and Nicobar Islands and Lakshadweep and parts of Sikkim. Some of these requirements are occasionally lifted for a year.
Iraqi Kurdistan	eVisa	
Kazakhstan	Special permission required	Special permission required for the town of Baikonur and surrounding areas in Kyzylorda Oblast, and the town of Gvardeyskiy near Almaty.
(Iran) Kish Island	Visa not required	Visitors to Kish Island do not require a visa.
Macau	Visa not required	90 days
(Malaysia) Sabah and Sarawak	Visa not required	These states have their own immigration authorities and passport is required to travel to them, however the same visa applies.
Maldives	Permission required	With the exception of the capital Malé, tourists are generally prohibited from visiting non-resort islands without the express permission of the Government of Maldives.
North Korea outside Pyongyang	Special permit required	People are not allowed to leave the capital city, tourists can only leave the capital with a governmental tourist guide (no independent moving)
Palestine	Visa not required	Arrival by sea to Gaza Strip not allowed.
Taiwan	Visa not required	90 days
(Tajikistan) Gorno-Badakhshan Autonomous Province	OIVR permit required	OIVR permit required (15+5 Tajikistani Somoni) and another special permit (free of charge) is required for Lake Sarez.
(China) Tibet Autonomous Region	TTP required	Tibet Travel Permit required (10 US Dollars).
Turkmenistan	Special permit required	A special permit, issued prior to arrival by Ministry of Foreign Affairs, is required if visiting the following places: Atamurat, Cheleken, Dashoguz, Serakhs and Serhetabat.
(United Nations) Korean Demilitarized Zone	Restricted zone.	
(United Nations) UNDOF Zone and Ghajar	Restricted zone.	
(Vietnam) Phú Quốc	Visa not required	30 days
Yemen	Special permission required	Special permission needed for travel outside Sanaa or Aden.
Caribbean and North Atlantic
(Portugal) Azores	Freedom of movement	Unlimited Stay in Portugal Territory, the Portuguese Citizens Permanently have the right to live and work freely in Azores.
Anguilla	Visa not required	3 months
Aruba	Visa not required	30 days, extendable to 180 days
Bermuda	Visa not required	Up to 6 months, decided on arrival
(Netherlands) Bonaire, St. Eustatius and Saba	Visa not required	3 months
British Virgin Islands	Visa not required	30 days, extensions possible
Cayman Islands	Visa not required	6 months
Curacao	Visa not required	3 months
(France) French Guiana	Freedom of movement	Identity card valid.
(France) French West Indies	Freedom of movement	French West Indies refers to Martinique, Guadeloupe, Saint Martin and Saint Barthélemy.: Identity card valid.
Greenland	Visa not required	Identity card valid.
Montserrat	Visa not required	6 months; Identity card valid (max.14 days).
Puerto Rico	Visa Waiver Program	90 days on arrival from overseas for 2 years, ESTA required
Saint Pierre and Miquelon	Freedom of movement	Identity card valid.
(Colombia) San Andrés and Leticia	Tourist Card on arrival	Visitors arriving at Gustavo Rojas Pinilla International Airport and Alfredo Vásquez Cobo International Airport must buy tourist cards on arrival.
Sint Maarten	Visa not required	3 months
Turks and Caicos Islands	Visa not required	90 days
U.S. Virgin Islands	Visa Waiver Program	90 days on arrival from overseas for 2 years, ESTA required
Oceania
American Samoa	Electronic authorization	30 days
(Australia) Ashmore and Cartier Islands	Special authorisation required	Special authorisation required.
(France) Clipperton Island	Special permit required	Special permit required.
Cook Islands	Visa not required	31 days
(Fiji) Lau Province	Special permission required	Special permission required.
French Polynesia	Freedom of movement	Identity card valid.
Guam	Visa Waiver Program	90 days on arrival from overseas for 2 years, ESTA required
New Caledonia	Freedom of movement	Identity card valid.
Niue	Visa not required	30 days
Northern Mariana Islands	Visa not required	Visa not required under the Visa Waiver Program, for 90 days on arrival from overseas for 2 years. ESTA required.
Pitcairn Islands	Visa not required	14 days visa free and landing fee US$35 or tax of US$5 if not going ashore.
Tokelau	Entry permit required	
United States Minor Outlying Islands	Special permits required	Special permits required for Baker Island, Howland Island, Jarvis Island, Johnston Atoll, Kingman Reef, Midway Atoll, Palmyra Atoll and Wake Island.
Wallis and Futuna	Freedom of movement	Identity card valid.
South America
Galápagos	Pre-registration required	Online pre-registration is required. Transit Control Card must also be obtained at the airport prior to departure.
South Atlantic and Antarctica
Falkland Islands	Visa not required	A visitor permit is normally issued as a stamp in the passport on arrival, The maximum validity period is 1 month.
South Georgia and the South Sandwich Islands	Permit required	Pre-arrival permit from the Commissioner required (72 hours/1 month for 110/160 pounds sterling).
Antarctica		Special permits required for British Antarctic Territory, French Southern and Antarctic Lands, Argentine Antarctica, (Australia) Australian Antarctic Territory, (Antártica Chilena Province) Chilean Antarctic Territory, (Australia) Heard Island and McDonald Islands, (Norway) Peter I Island, (Norway) Queen Maud Land, (New Zealand) Ross Dependency.

== Identity card or Passport ==
(Portugal) Portuguese Identity card (Cartão de cidadão) is valid for these countries : Due to Freedom of Movement in European Union / Schengen Area:

- Austria
- Belgium
- Bulgaria
- Croatia
- Cyprus
- Czech Republic
- Denmark
- Estonia
- Finland
- France and Overseas Territories
- Germany
- Greece
- Hungary
- Iceland
- Ireland
- Italy
- Latvia
- Liechtenstein
- Lithuania
- Luxembourg
- Malta
- Netherlands
- Norway
- Poland
- Romania
- Slovakia
- Slovenia
- Spain
- Sweden
- Switzerland

For Tourism with Identity card or Passport is also valid for traveling in these countries:

- Albania
- Andorra
- Bosnia and Herzegovina
- Egypt^{1}
- Georgia
- Jordan^{2}
- Kosovo
- Monaco
- Moldova
- Montenegro
- North Macedonia
- Northern Cyprus
- Serbia
- San Marino
- Tunisia^{2}
- Turkey
- Vatican City

Identity card or Passport is valid for 90 days of visit in (Albania), (Andorra), (Bosnia and Herzegovina), (Kosovo), (Monaco), (Moldova), (North Macedonia), (Northern Cyprus), (Serbia), (San Marino), (Turkey) and (Vatican City).

(Georgia) Identity card or Passport is valid for 1 year of visit.

(Montenegro) Identity card is valid for 30 days of visit, or with Passport for 90 days of visit.

1 - (Egypt) Identity card or Passport is valid for 30 days of visit, {evisa} or {visa on arrival}.

2 - (Tunisia) Identity card is valid on an Organized Tours visit only, or with Passport – {Visa not Required} is valid for 90 days of visit.

(Jordan) Identity card is valid on an Organized Tours visit or with Passport – {visa on arrival} is valid for 30 days of visit.

== Remote work visas ==
Portuguese citizens can apply for a resident permit on the basis of a remote worker from the following countries:

Country	Duration	Cost	Basic conditions
Antigua and Barbuda	2 years	1,500 USD for one person, 2,000 USD for a couple, 3,000 USD for a family of 3 or more.	Must be working remotely for a company outside of Antigua and Barbuda.; Earn a minimum of US$50,000 per year.; Medical insurance required.
Anguilla (UK Overseas Territory)	Up to 1 year	2,000 USD for one person and 3,000 USD for a family of 4 (plus an additional 250 USD for each additional family member).	Proof of employment or Business Incorporation Certificate.; Police Certificate of Character.; Medical insurance required.
Bahamas	Up to 1 year	1,000 USD (plus 500 USD for each dependent)	Proof of employment.; Police Certificate of Character.; Medical insurance required.; 25 USD application fee.
Barbados	12 months	2,000 USD	Must be working remotely for a company outside of Barbados.; Earn a minimum of 50,000 USD per year.; Must undergo for a mandatory COVID-19 test and 48-hour quarantine.; Medical insurance required.
Bermuda (UK Overseas Territory)	Up to 1 year	263 USD	Must be working remotely for a company outside of Bermuda.; No minimum income required.; Must undergo for a mandatory COVID test.; Show proof of travel insurance.
Cayman Islands (UK Overseas Territory)	Up to 2 years	1,469 USD	Must be working remotely for a company outside of the Cayman Islands.; No minimum income required.; Must undergo for a mandatory COVID test.; Show proof of travel insurance.
Costa Rica	1 year	TBC	Must be working remotely for a company outside of Costa Rica.; Earn a minimum of US$3,000 a month.; Show proof of travel insurance.
Curaçao (Dutch Overseas Territory)	6 months, extendable.	294 USD	Employed by a company registered in a foreign country, Business Incorporation Certificate or Freelancer or consulting services to clients with contracts in foreign countries.; Proof of solvency.; Show proof of travel insurance.
Mauritius	12 months	Free of charge.	Must be working remotely for a company outside of Mauritius.; Proof of income.; Must undergo for a mandatory COVID test.; Health insurance with Mauritius coverage validity.
Mexico	Up to 3 years		Must be working remotely for a company outside of Mexico.; Earn a minimum of EUR$1,742.54 a month or a bank statement proving funds of EUR$29,042.47.; Health insurance with Mexico coverage validity.
United Arab Emirates	1 year	287 USD	Proof of Employment from current employer with a one-year contract, or proof of ownership of company.; Earn a minimum of US$5,000 a month, last months’ payslip and 3 preceding months’ bank statements.; Health insurance with UAE coverage validity.

== Working holiday agreement ==
Portuguese citizens aged 18–30 (or 18–35 in some cases) can apply for a resident permit on the basis of a working holiday from the following countries:

Country	Duration	Cost	Age restriction	Notes
Australia	1 year		18 to 30 years	Must have a bank statement proving funds of AUD$5,000.; Eligible to apply for subclass division 462 (Work and Holiday).
Canada	24 months		18 to 35 years (inclusive)	Have a minimum of CAN$2,500; Medical insurance required.
Japan	1 year		18 to 30 years (at time of application)	Must be residing in Portugal at time of application.; Must have a bank statement proving funds of EUR$2,000.
New Zealand	1 year		18 to 30 years	Must have a bank statement proving funds of NZ$4,200.
South Korea	1 year		18 to 30 years	Must have a bank statement proving funds of KRW 3,000,000.; From 2019, 1000 places will be available under this scheme.

== Non-ordinary Diplomatic passports ==
Holders of various categories of official Portuguese passports have additional visa-free access to the following countries – Algeria (diplomatic, service or special passports), Angola (diplomatic, service or special passports), Azerbaijan (diplomatic, service or special passports), China (diplomatic passports), Republic of the Congo (diplomatic passports), Indonesia (diplomatic, official or service passports), Kazakhstan (diplomatic passports), Kuwait (diplomatic, service or special passports), Mozambique (diplomatic, official or service passports), Qatar (diplomatic or special passports), Russia (diplomatic passports) and São Tomé and Príncipe (diplomatic or service passports), Turkey (diplomatic or service passports) . Holders of diplomatic or service passports of any country have visa-free access to Cape Verde, Ethiopia, Mali and Zimbabwe.

== Passport validity length ==
Many countries require passports to be valid for at least 6 months upon arrival and one or two blank pages.

Countries requiring passports to be valid at least 6 months on arrival include Afghanistan, Algeria, Bangladesh, Bhutan, Botswana, Brunei, Cambodia, Comoros, Côte d'Ivoire, Ecuador, Egypt, El Salvador, Fiji, Guyana, Haiti, Indonesia, Iran, Iraq (except when arriving at Basra – 3 months and Erbil or Sulaimaniyah – on arrival), Jordan, Kenya, Kiribati, Kuwait, Laos, Madagascar, Malaysia, Marshall Islands, Mauritania, Mongolia, Myanmar, Namibia, Nicaragua, Nigeria, Oman, Palau, Papua New Guinea, Philippines, Rwanda, Samoa, Saudi Arabia, Singapore, Solomon Islands, Somalia, Sri Lanka, Sudan, Suriname, Syria, Taiwan, Tanzania, Timor-Leste, Tonga, Tuvalu, Uganda, United Arab Emirates, Vanuatu, Venezuela, Vietnam, Yemen.

Turkey usually requires passports to be valid for at least 5 months (150 days) upon entry, but for Portuguese citizens Turkish authorities allow to enter even with passport expired within last 5 years.

Countries requiring passport validity of at least 4 months on arrival include Azerbaijan, Micronesia, Zambia.

Countries requiring passport validity of at least 3 months on arrival include Albania, Bosnia and Herzegowina, Honduras, Moldova, Nauru, North Macedonia, Panama, Qatar, Senegal and French territories in the Pacific (i.e. French Polynesia, New Caledonia and Wallis and Futuna).

Countries requiring passport validity of at least 1 month on arrival include Eritrea, Hong Kong, Lebanon, Macau, Maldives, New Zealand, South Africa.

Other countries require either a passport valid on arrival or passport valid throughout the period of intended stay.

== Fingerprinting ==
Several countries including Argentina, Cambodia, Colombia, Japan, Malaysia, Saudi Arabia, South Korea and the United States demand all passengers to be fingerprinted on arrival.

== Right to consular protection in non-EU countries ==
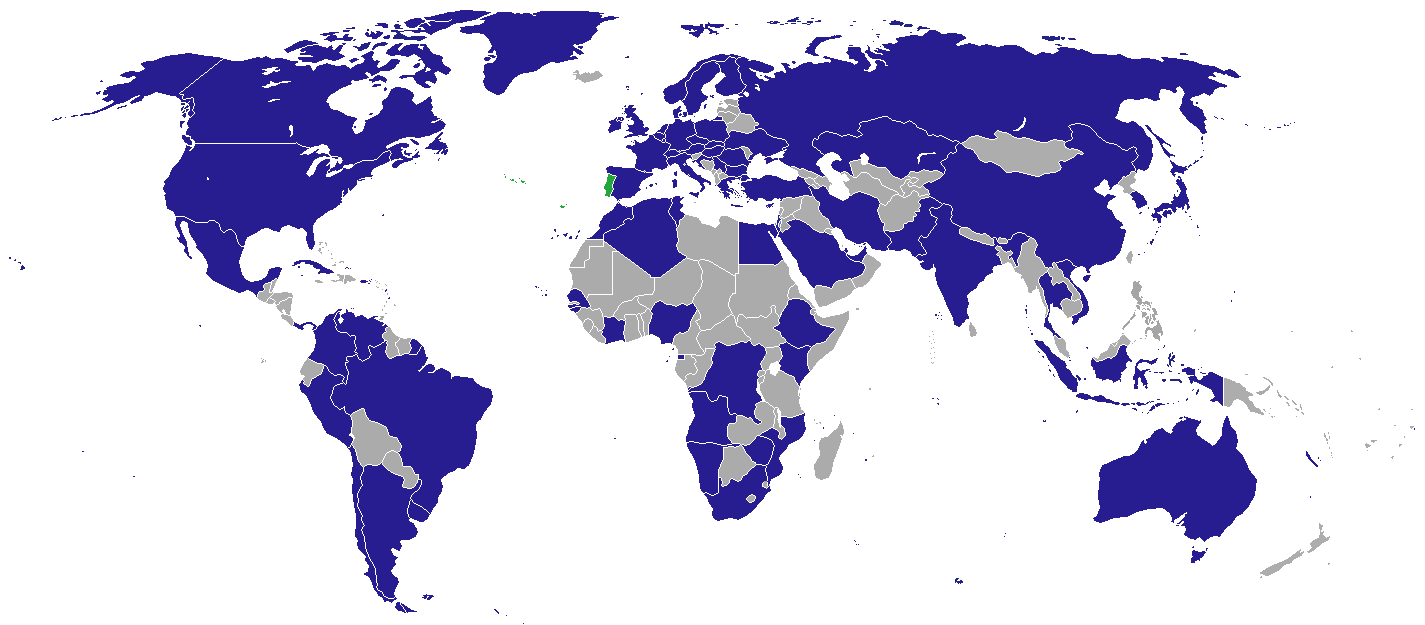
Diplomatic missions of Portugal.

When in a non-EU country where there is no Portuguese embassy, Portuguese citizens as EU citizens have the right to get consular protection from the embassy of any other EU country present in that country.

See also List of diplomatic missions of Portugal.

== See also ==
- Visa requirements for European Union citizens
- Visa policy of the Schengen Area
- Foreign relations of Portugal
