= Bilhete de Identidade (Portugal) =

Discontinued national identity card of Portugal

Bilhete de Identidade (Identity Card), commonly abbreviated as BI, was the national identity card of Portugal. Established in 1919, the BI is gradually being replaced by the Cartão de Cidadão (Citizen Card) since 2008. BI's are valid for five years from date of issue for people under the age of 25, and then for ten years, and can be renewed 6 months before expiry. It is mandatory for all citizens above the age of 10, and available optionally for children.

Besides the Bilhetes de Identidade de Cidadão Nacional (National Citizen Identity Cards), the Portuguese authorities also issued Bilhetes de Identidade de Cidadão Estrangeiro (Foreign Citizen Identity Cards) for foreigners living in Portugal.

Since 2008 the Bilhete de Identidade and several other documents started to be phased out in favor of the single, more technologically advanced Cartão de Cidadão (Citizen Card). However, as of 2017, BIs continued to be issued in some cases.

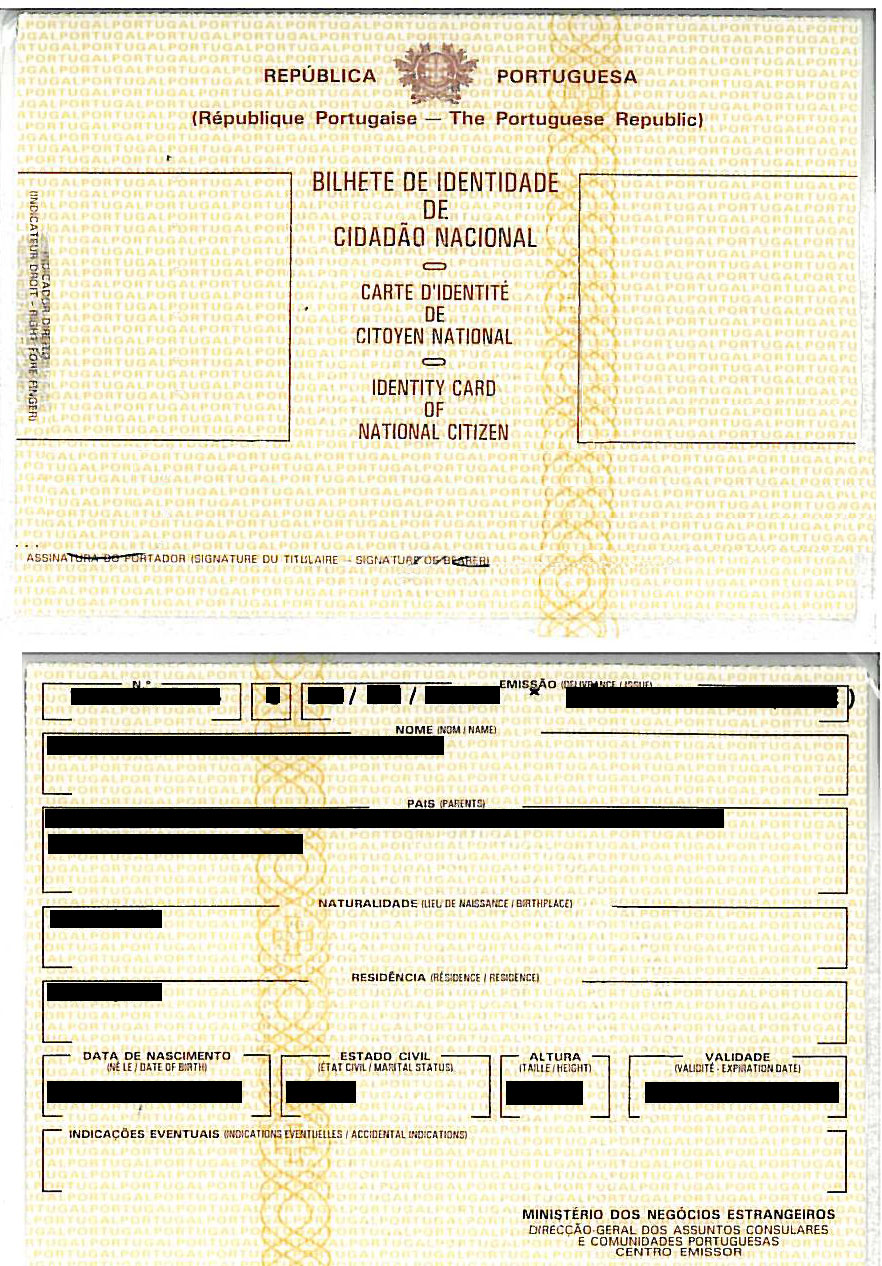
Blank Bilhete de Identidade

== Uses ==
On January 1, 2001 it became mandatory for all Portuguese citizens over the age of 10 to carry a valid Bilhete de Identidade.

As the Bilhete de Identidade meets European Union identity card standards it can be used as a travel document within the EU and some other European countries such as North Macedonia, Montenegro, Serbia, replacing a passport.

== Appearance ==
The card is a 10.5 × 7.5 cm laminated card embossed with the seal of the Ministério dos Negócios Estrangeiros (Ministry of Foreign Affairs).

=== Information Contained ===
The front contains:

- The Portuguese Coat of Arms
- Photo of the bearer
- Fingerprint from the right index finger
- Signature

The reverse side contains:

- Registration number
- Full name of the bearer
- Birth date
- Filiation
- Birth place
- Residence place
- Marital status
- Height
- Issuing office
- Date of expiration

=== Languages ===
Text printed on the Bilhete de Identidade, such as "Name", "Date of Birth", etc., is in Portuguese, and translated into English and French to meet ICAO standards for international travel documents.

== Application ==
All citizens of Portugal are entitled to a Bilhete de Identidade. In Portugal, applications must be made in person to a Loja do Cidadão (Civil Assistance Center.) Overseas applications need to be made in person at an embassy, consulate-general, or consulate.

Proof of Portuguese citizenship is required to apply for a first Bilhete de Identidade. For example:

- If citizen by birth: a valid (issued with the past 6 months) birth certificate is required.
- If citizen through descent: birth certificate from country of birth, valid birth certificates of the legal ascendant(s) (one of whom must have been born in Portugal.)

Other cases, such as naturalised citizens, are discussed in Portuguese nationality law.

Consular authorities may require other identification (e.g. expired passports, valid passports for other countries of citizenship) as required by local law. A 3.5 × 3.5 cm color photograph is required.

== Discontinuation ==
Until 2008 holders of the Bilhete de Identidade also required a Social Security Card, National Health Service Card, Taxpayer Card and Voter's Card. In addition to this profusion of documents, the Bilhete de Identidade had the disadvantage that it was widely counterfeited.

In response to these concerns from 2006 the Bilhete de Identidade was being phased out in favor of the much wider-scoped Cartão de Cidadão (Citizen Card). The newer card replaces all the documents listed above, and is a secure smart card which is not easily counterfeited. Also, identity documents could no longer be issued by Portuguese consulates as previously; identity documents could only be issued in Lisbon (although applied for elsewhere).

== See also ==
- Portuguese Passport
- Portuguese nationality law
- Citizen Card (Portugal)
