= Cartório =

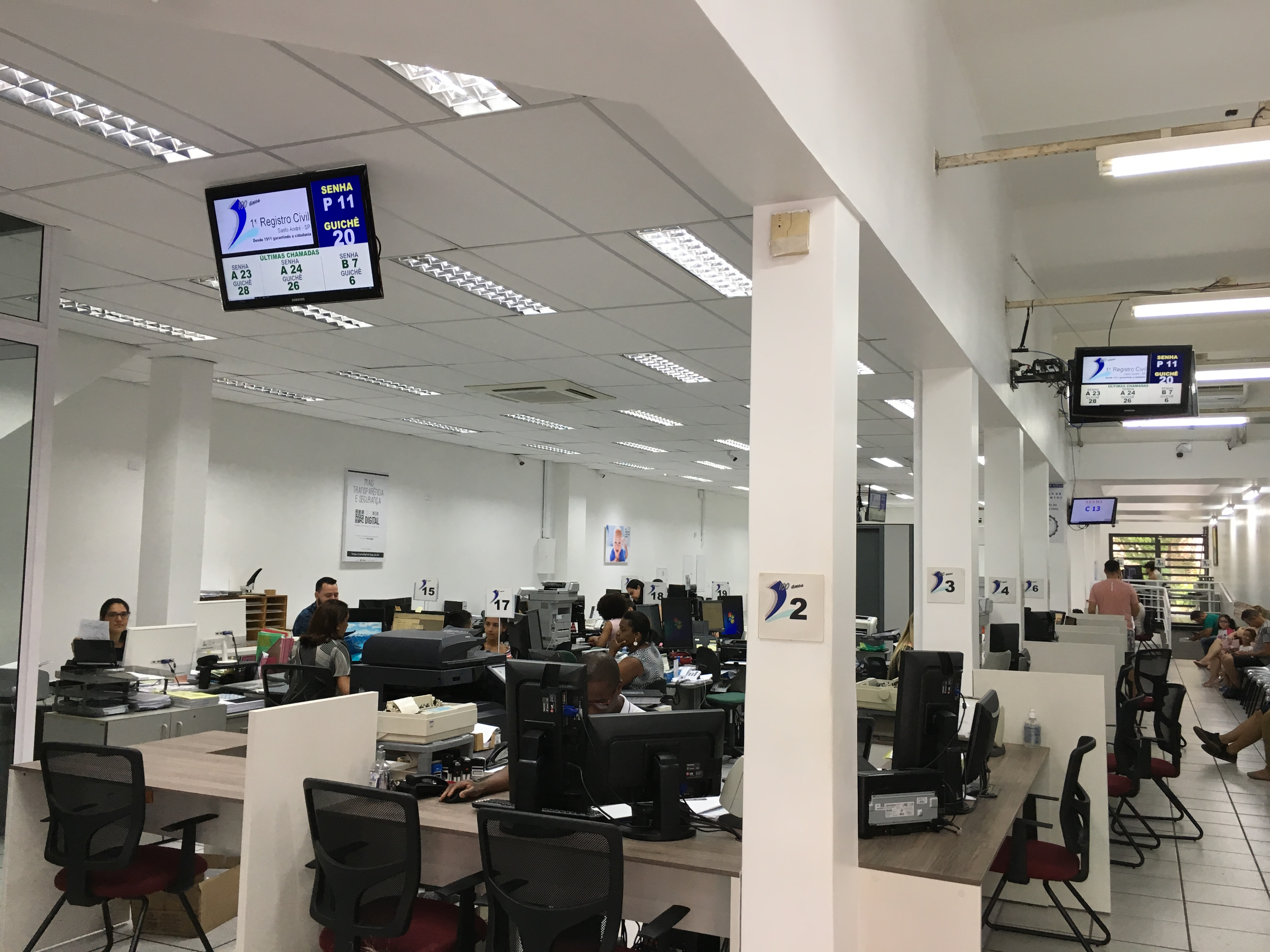
1st Civil Registry Office of Santo André, São Paulo

Cartório is a colloquial name for Notary offices (officially called extrajudicial services) are fundamental institutions for legal security in Brazil, as they guarantee the publicity, authenticity, security, and effectiveness of acts and documents performed in civil and economic life. The word "cartório" originates from the Latin charta, meaning "paper" or "document," plus the suffix derived from orius, here as a noun-forming element, and originally means "one who deals with papers". Historically, the term came to designate the places intended for the writing, safekeeping, and authentication of legal acts. In Brazil, the notary tradition was inherited from Portuguese Law, which structured the first registration and notary systems. Even though the 1988 Federal Constitution (art. 236) and Law No. 8,935/1994 use the expression "notarial and registry services", the popular term "cartório" (registry office) remains and reflects the long historical tradition of these establishments. Currently, although legal texts adopt the expression "notarial and registry services", the term "cartório" remains in common use throughout the country.

== History ==
During the colonial period, essential records were kept by Church officials, who used parish books to record baptisms, marriages, and deaths. This practice, rooted in the Philippine Ordinances, allowed for social organization and proof of affiliation and property. Thus, notarial functions were initially linked to ecclesiastical activity.

The major change occurred with the Proclamation of the Republic in 1889, which broke the Church's exclusive dependence on records. From that moment on, civil registration became the responsibility of the State, gradually creating a system of extrajudicial services with registration and notary functions. This new system was formalized with the enactment of Law No. 6,015/1973 (Public Registry Law) and, subsequently, with Law No. 8,935/1994 (Notaries and Registrars Law), which established criteria, deadlines, and the holding of public examinations for entry into the career.

In the following decades, registry offices underwent a process of modernization and computerization, driven by the National Council of Justice (CNJ). The implementation of electronic systems for issuing certificates, the use of digital platforms, and the standardization of procedures contributed to making the service more transparent, agile, and secure. These initiatives allowed Brazil to become an international reference in the efficiency and reach of extrajudicial services.

In Brazil, the term has come to designate a wider range of competencies beyond the notary's office, including the civil registration of individuals and legal entities, real estate registration, registration of titles and documents, offices for protesting titles, and also judicial offices (courts) where court cases of any nature are processed. Extrajudicial offices are those that are not directly linked to the Judiciary, which in turn are called "judicial offices".

Until the proclamation of the Republic, civil registration in Brazil was performed by the Church, due to the patronage system. Subsequently, the function passed to the notaries. With the Federal Constitution (CF) of 1988, the former "extrajudicial services" officially became known as Notary and Registry Services (art. 236). However, the informal denomination of "extrajudicial office" is still common.

In the past, notaries were considered family property and their succession was hereditary. Following the new Federal Constitution, entry into the profession began to require a public examination, although the implementation of this rule took some time to actually occur.

Notarial and registry activity was regulated in 1994 by Federal Law No. 8,935. Since then, topics such as communication innovations, computerization, forms of document archiving, responsible independence of the public service holder, and satisfactory service provision have been developed in the aforementioned legal instrument. According to the norm, these Services aim to "guarantee the publicity, authenticity, security and effectiveness of legal acts" (art. 1º).

== Types ==
The holders of Notary and Registry Services (art. 3) are called notaries (or registrars) and registry officers (or registrars), and may fall into the following categories (art. 5):

- Civil Registry of Natural Persons and of Interdictions and Guardianship: Responsible for the registration of births, marriages, deaths, emancipations, interdictions and guardianships.
- Civil Registry of Legal Entities and of Titles and Documents: In charge of registering the constitutive acts and amendments of simple societies, associations and foundations, in addition to registering various documents for the purposes of conservation and validity against third parties.
- Real Estate Registry: Handles the registration, recording and annotation of acts relating to real estate, ensuring legal security in real estate transactions.
- Notary Public: Prepares public deeds, powers of attorney, wills, recognizes signatures and authenticates copies, conferring public faith to the documents.
- Protest of Titles Notary Office: Responsible for protesting titles and other debt documents, formalizing the debtor's default.
- Distribution Registry: Performs the equitable distribution of processes and titles among the competent notary offices, avoiding the concentration of services.
- Maritime Contracts Notary and Registry: Specialized in the drafting and registration of contracts and acts related to maritime activities.

== Fideijurídicos Services ==
Fideijurídicos is a proposed expression to designate "all activities that analyze the conformity of a certain object to the legal order, in the interest of society, and attest to this conformity, with a presumption of veracity". The concept expresses three main characteristics:

The performance by the competent entity of a legal analysis, that is, that a certain act or object is in conformity with the Law;

That the analysis performed is independent, that is, performed by an entity that is not, in any case, interested in the legal situation being modified; and Public faith, which is the legal presumption that the act performed is in accordance with the Law.

Although the expression is primarily applied to extrajudicial registry offices, it is proposed that it may also encompass other services, provided that the three indicated requirements are met, such as, for example, the registration of industrial property and the registration of vessels in the Maritime Court.

== See also ==
- Institute of Registries and Notary
