= Institute of Registries and Notary =

Portuguese public organization

- Instituto dos Registos e do Notariado
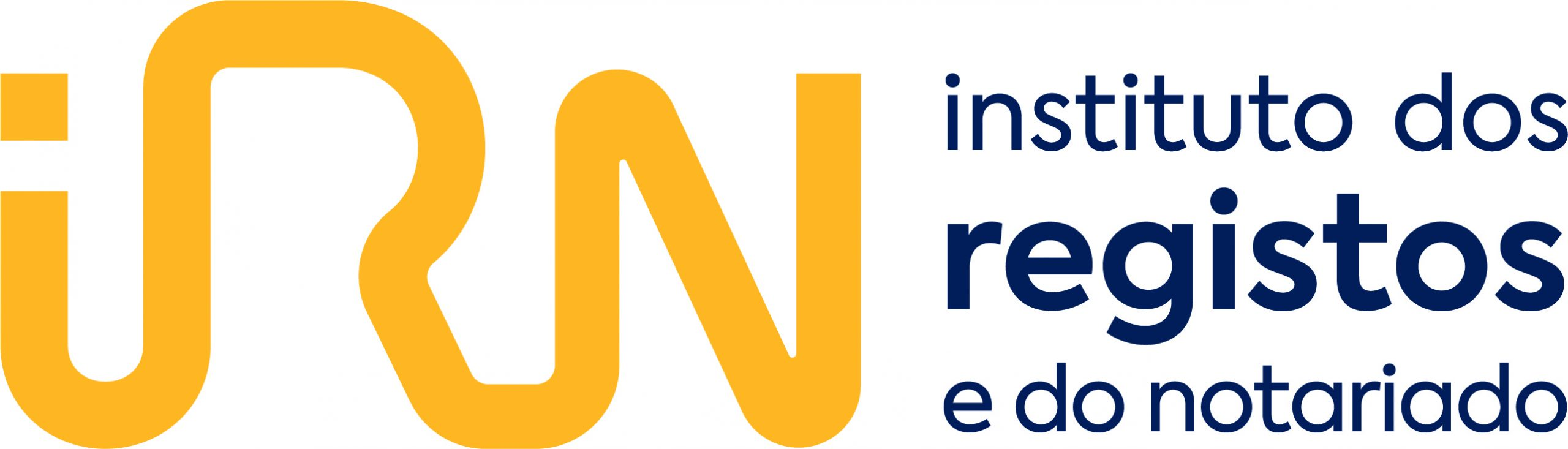

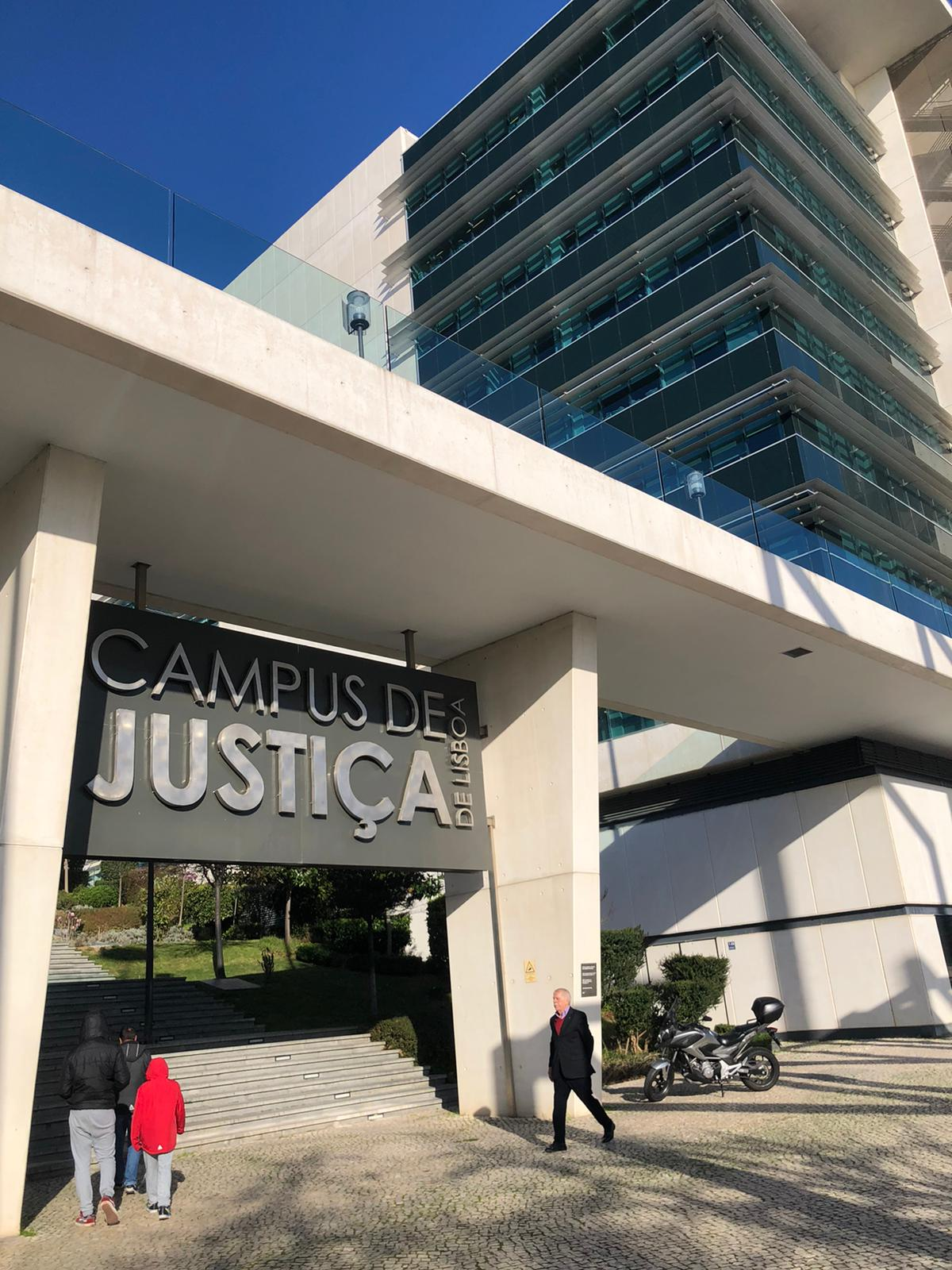

Government agency overview
- Formed: 1945
- Jurisdiction: Government of Portugal
- Headquarters: Campus de Justiça, Lisbon; 38.773446081°N 9.095905011°W
- Parent Government agency: Ministry of Justice
- Website: irn.justica.gov.pt

Institute of Registries and Notary (Portuguese: Instituto dos Registos e do Notariado) is a Portuguese public organization subordinated to the Ministry of Justice, and is dealing with civil registration and registration of entities and vehicles.

== History ==
The organization passed through number of iterations and reforms. In 1945 the General Directorate of Registries and Notaries was created (Portuguese: Direção Geral dos Registos e do Notariado). to oversee On December 22, 1945, the General Directorate of Registries and Notaries was created within the Ministry of Justice, to oversee civil, property, commercial and automobile registration services and notary services. In 1950 the Central Register of Wills (Portuguese: o Registo Central de Testamentos) was created. In 1959 The General Directorate of Registries and Notaries (Portuguese: Direção Geral dos Registos e do Notariado) now had responsibility for classifying registry offices and organizing the territory. In 1986 New Commercial Registry Code establishes the total autonomy of the commercial registry in relation to the land registry. On 1 May 2007 the organization received its current name and form when the General Directorate of Registries and Notaries (Portuguese: Direção-Geral dos Registos e Notariado was merged with several conservatórias and registry services in accordance with Decree-Law No. 76/2007. In December 2022 workers of the IRN struck for allegedly bad working conditions. In 2013 the Civil Identification Institute was merged into the Institute of Registries and Notary. In 2017 the Justiça.gov.pt portal was launched aiming at improving service. In June 2023 the Portuguese government published the Recovery and Resilience Plan, according to which the IRN would receive substantial investments in the upcoming years hiring additional staff and investing in new IT systems. In September that year, the workers' labour union again criticized the government for the lack of resources, which led to long queues.

== Operations and duties ==
The Institute of Registries and Notary is responsible for various operations related to civil registry, including the issuance of birth certificates, marriage certificates, death certificates and the processing of citizenship requests. The IRN has office in each Portuguese province, and in the cities of Lisbon, Porto, Vila Nova de Gaia and Setubal there are eleven, four, two and two conservatories respectively. In small and medium-sized municipalities, conservatories also accumulate other functions besides the civil registry, such as land registration (Portuguese: registo predial), commercial (legal entities, Portuguese: registo comercial) and vehicles (Portuguese: registo de automóveis). In Lisbon, the Central Registry Office (Portuguese: Conservatória dos Registos Centrais) is located, it was created in 1949 and is responsible for registrations involving Portuguese citizens abroad and for the management of any procedure that concerns Portuguese citizenship. Following the liquidation of the Foreigners and Borders Service, some of the latter's responsibilities were transferred to the IRN, including the granting and issuance of the Portuguese passport, as well as managing renewals of residence permits.

== See also ==
- Civil registration
- Vital record
- Identity card (Portugal)
- Portuguese passport
- Cartório
