= Portuguese passport =

Passport issued to Portuguese nationals

Portuguese passport; Passaporte português
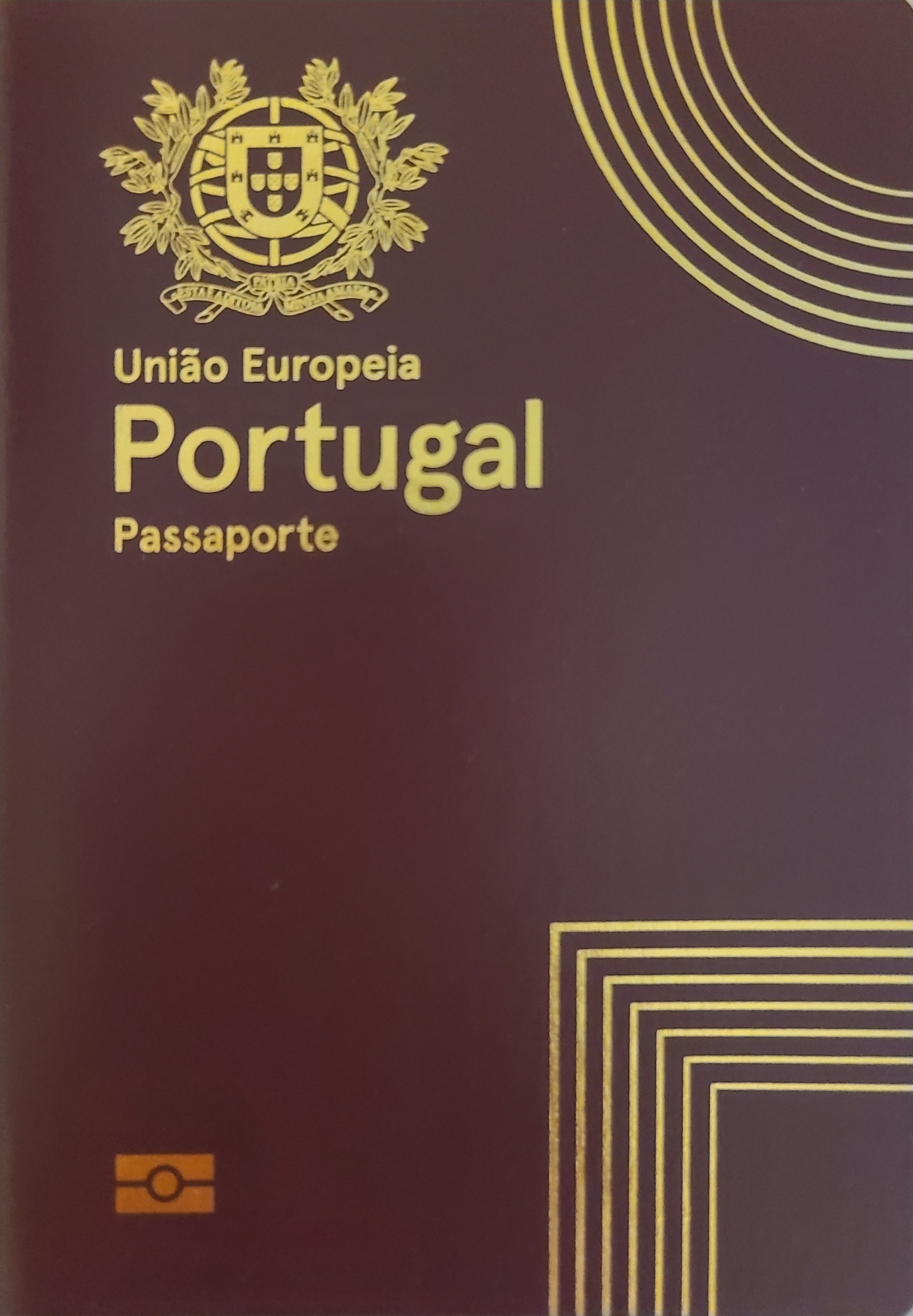
- 2017 Passport version
- Type: Passport
- Issued by: Institute of Registries and Notary
- First issued: 10 July 2017 (current version); 28 August 2006 (biometric passport)
- Purpose: Identification
- Eligibility: Portuguese citizenship
- Expiration: 5 years after issuance for individuals aged 5 and above; 2 years for citizens 4 and under
- Cost: €65

A Portuguese passport (Portuguese: Passaporte português) is an identity document issued to citizens of Portugal for the purpose of international travel. The passport, along with the Citizen Card allows for free rights of movement and residence in any of the states of the European Union, European Economic Area and Switzerland. Every Portuguese citizen is also a citizen of the European Union.

== History ==
The first machine readable passport was introduced in 2001. On 28 August 2006, the Portuguese government began issuing the first version of electronic passports (Passaporte Electrónico Português, commonly abbreviated as PEP) which in addition to containing enhanced security features also contain a contactless microchip. The microchip included all the biographic information printed in the passport as well as a digital version of the photograph suitable for use in digital facial recognition.

The 2006 version electronic passport was designed by Henrique Cayatte. Its final form incorporated a set of thematic elements related to Portuguese poets Luís Vaz de Camões and Fernando Pessoa in both its technical and aesthetic elements. Images were provided by the Portuguese painter Júlio Pomar. In 2017 a new model was put into use, designed by Jorge Silva. It features a set of 20 elements of the Portuguese UNESCO World Heritage throughout the interior pages. In early 2025 it was announced that the Portuguese government would hold a competition among Portuguese citizens for a new passport design around the "National Territory" theme with the author of the winning design receiving a prize worth 5,000 euros.

== Description ==
The regular passport is a deep red colour with golden print, and is written only in Portuguese. Following European Union Standards, the passport bears the title União Europeia above the country name, the title of Passaporte, and the Portuguese coat of arms. It contains all official languages of the EU. The cover is only printed in Portuguese with translations inside the first page. The fields on the biographic page are printed in Portuguese, English, and French (in that order), with translations in the last three pages of the passport.

The passport includes several security features: invisible ink that shows up under UV light, security paper with a watermark of the Portuguese coat of arms, and a perforated passport number at the bottom of every page.

The passport has 32 pages, excluding the biographic information page, however only 28 are suitable for visas, while the other 4 pages include the translation of the fields in the biographic page into each of the official languages of the EU.

=== Identity Information Page ===
The data page of a Portuguese (specimen) biometric passport, 2018

The biographic information is the first page at the front of the passport. It includes the following information:

- Type
- Code of Issuing (Código do Pais)
- Passport No. (Passaporte №)
- Surname (Apelido(s))
- Given names (Nome(s) próprio(s))
- Nationality (Nacionalidade)
- Height (Altura)
- Date of birth (Data de nascimento)
- Personal number (№ de identificação pessoal)
- Sex (M/F) (Sexo)
- Place of birth (Local de nascimento)
- Date of issue (Data da omissão)
- Authority (Autoridade)
- Date of expiry (Válido até)
- Holder's signature (Assinatura do titular)

== Application ==
All citizens of Portugal are entitled to a Portuguese passport. In Portugal, applications for a Portuguese passport need to be made in person in the Institute of Registries and Notary offices (one or more existing in every Portuguese parish) or in a Loja do Cidadão (in the Azores, RIAC – Rede Integrada de Apoio ao Cidadão, English: Citizen's Assistance Centres). Overseas applications need to be made in person at a consular authority (e.g. embassy, consulate-general, or consulate).

To apply for a passport, an individual needs to provide a valid Bilhete de Identidade or a valid Cartão de Cidadão.

== Gallery of historic images ==
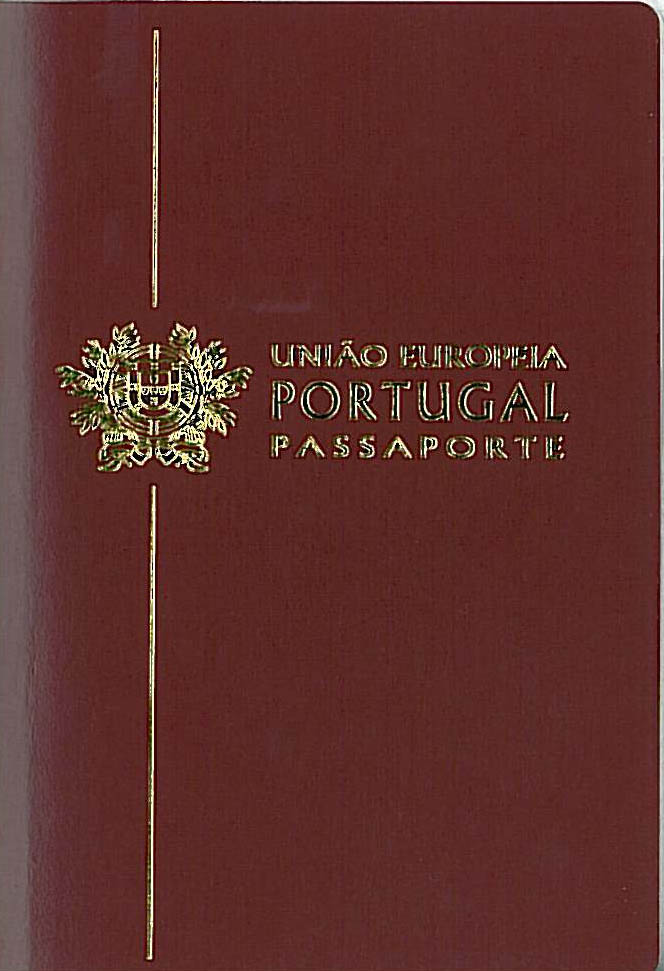
Portuguese machine readable passport (2001–2006)

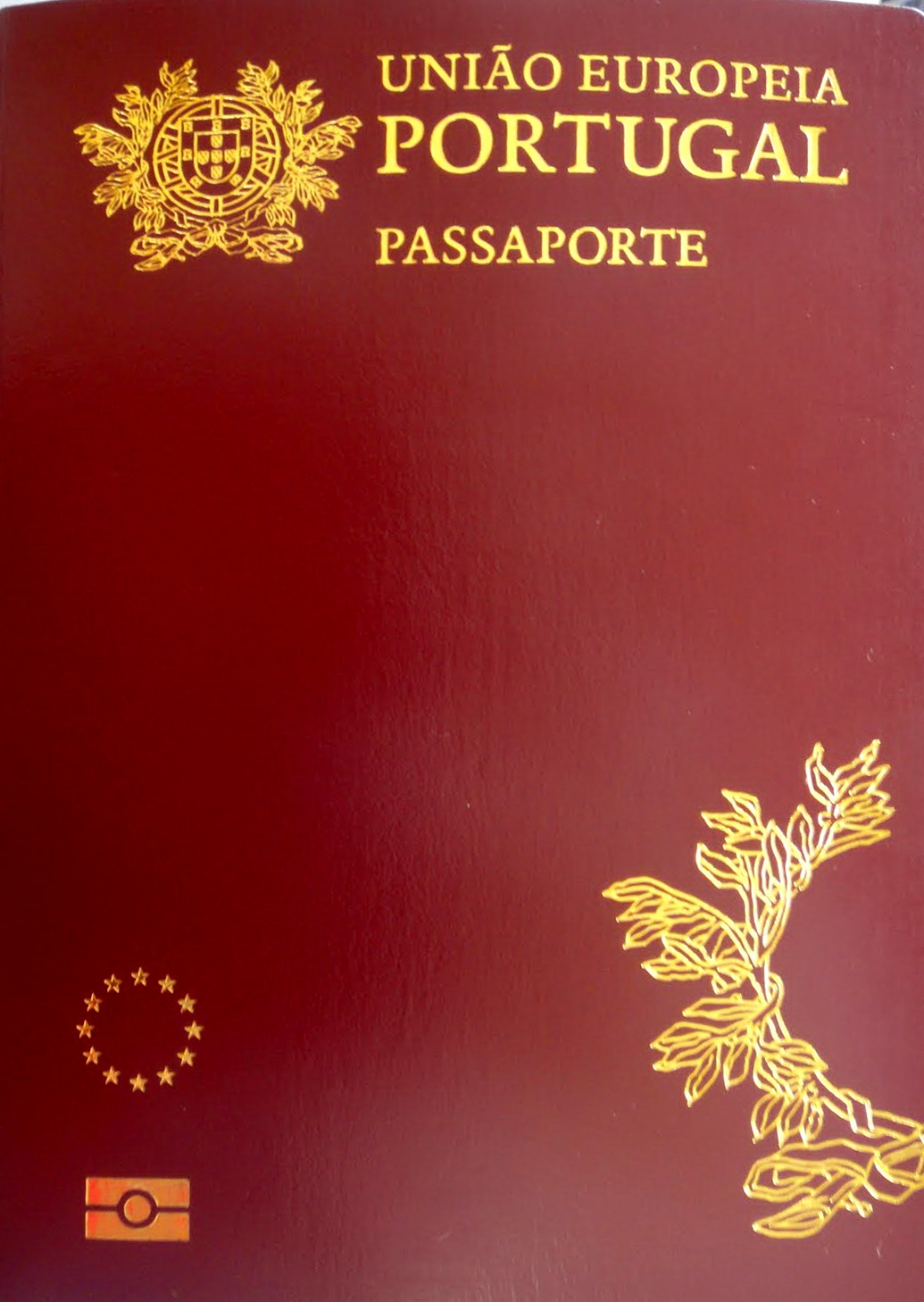
Portuguese electronic passport (2006–2017)

== Visa requirements map ==
Visa requirements for Portuguese citizens Portugal Freedom of movement Visa not required / ESTA / eTA / eVisitor Visa on arrival eVisa Visa available both on arrival or online Visa required prior to arrival

Visa requirements for Portuguese citizens are administrative entry restrictions by the authorities of other states placed on citizens of Portugal. As of 09 October 2026, Portuguese citizens had visa-free or visa on arrival access to 185 countries and territories, with the Portuguese passport being in the 5th ranking group according to the number of destinations their holders can access without a prior visa, as ranked in the Henley Passport Index.

Portuguese citizens can live and work in any country within the EU as a result of the right of free movement and residence granted in Article 21 of the EU Treaty.

== See also ==
- Portuguese nationality law
- Visa requirements for Portuguese citizens
- Bilhete de Identidade
- Passports of the European Union
- Visa policy of the Schengen Area
