= Portuguese nationality law =

Nationality Act Lei da Nacionalidade

Assembly of the Republic
- Territorial extent: Portugal
- Enacted by: Assembly of the Republic
- Enacted: 3 October 1981
- Commenced: 3 October 1981
- Status: Amended

The primary law governing nationality of Portugal is the Nationality Act, which came into force on 3 October 1981. The latest amendment to the nationally law came into force on 19 May 2026 . Portugal is a member state of the European Union (EU) and all Portuguese nationals are EU citizens. They are entitled to free movement rights in EU and European Free Trade Association (EFTA) countries and may vote in elections to the European Parliament.

All persons born in Portugal before 3 October 1981 are automatically citizens by birth regardless of the nationalities of their parents. Individuals born in the country since that date receive Portuguese citizenship at birth if at least one of their parents is a Portuguese citizen or has legally resided in Portuguese territory for a minimum legal period of five years. Children born abroad to at least one Portuguese parent can acquire Portuguese citizenship, if they have their birth registered in the Portuguese civil registry through any Portuguese Embassy/Consulate. As of 19 May 2026 foreign nationals may become citizens by naturalisation after living in Portugal legally for a minimum of 10 years, showing proficiency in the Portuguese language, undergoing a civic knowledge test and have not been convicted and sentenced to more than three years imprisonment for certain crimes. Due to Portugal's historical status as a colonial empire, citizens of a former colony may acquire Portuguese citizenship after residing legally in Portugal for a minimum of 7 years, this applies to individuals from CPLP countries. Individuals from other EU countries can also apply for Portuguese nationality if they have resided legally in Portugal for a minimum of 7 years.

== Terminology ==
The distinction between the meaning of the terms citizenship and nationality is not always clear in the English language and differs by country. Generally, nationality refers a person's legal belonging to a country and is the common term used in international treaties when referring to members of a state; citizenship refers to the set of rights and duties a person has in that nation. In the Portuguese context, the two terms are normally used interchangeably. However, it can be possible for a non-national to obtain a degree of civil and political rights commonly associated with citizenship (e.g. voting rights), particularly individuals from Lusophone countries.

== History ==
=== 1603 Ordination ===
The first legal arrangements for Portuguese citizenship were created through the 1603 Ordination of King Philip II of Portugal (the Ordenações Filipinas). It regulated the acquisition of citizenship at birth through a mixed system of jus soli and jus sanguinis. Citizenship was acquired by children born in Portugal in wedlock to Portuguese fathers or out of wedlock to Portuguese mothers. Children born outside Portuguese territory did not receive citizenship unless their in-wedlock father or out-of-wedlock mother was in royal service abroad. Children born in Portugal to a non-Portuguese father in-wedlock or out-of-wedlock non-Portuguese mother only acquired citizenship if that parent had been living in Portugal for at least ten years and owned property there.

=== 1822 constitution ===
The Portuguese Constitution of 1822 both expanded and contracted transmission of citizenship by eliminating the parental property ownership requirement for jus soli birth to a non-Portuguese parent but by also requiring that the child continue to live in Portugal and declare the option for Portuguese nationality upon adulthood. It also expanded citizenship by descent to all children born outside Portugal to an in-wedlock Portuguese father or out-of-wedlock Portuguese mother, with the condition that the child take up residence in Portugal if the parent was not in royal service. Loss could occur with naturalisation in another country or the acceptance of foreign government employment, honors, or pension without Portuguese government permission. Discretionary naturalisation could be granted to persons who were living in Portugal while married to a Portuguese woman; acquired a trading, farming, or industrial establishment in Portugal; or performed certain services to the country.

=== 1826 constitutional charter ===
The Constitutional Charter of 1826, in effect during bouts of infighting and warring between 1826 and 1828, 1834 and 1836, and then finally between its 1842 restoration and the 1910 end of the monarchy and the founding of the Republic of Portugal, expanded jus soli to all non-enslaved persons born in Portuguese territory, as inspired by the 1824 Imperial Constitution of Brazil. Citizenship by descent continued to be limited to those children born outside Portugal whose in-wedlock fathers or out-of-wedlock mothers lived in Portugal, except where that parent was abroad in royal service. Loss of citizenship could occur with foreign naturalisation, certain criminal convictions, or acceptance of foreign government honors or rewards without Portuguese permission. It left to regular law the specifications for naturalisation, which in 1836 were detailed as being an adult, being financially self-sufficient, and having two years of residence in Portugal (except for a person of Portuguese origin, having a Portuguese wife, or having accomplished certain actions).

=== 1867 civil code ===
The 1867/1868 Civil Code provisions provided the details for the 1826 charter's broad language, including the ability for a child to opt out by declaration from the automatic jus soli citizenship for persons born in Portugal to a foreign father or out-of-wedlock mother. (If the declaration was made on behalf of the child, the child could withdraw the declaration upon adulthood.) The 1867 civil code additions also softened the jus sanguinis requirements of the 1826 charter by allowing for jus sanguinis by declaration of desire for Portuguese nationality as an alternative to actual residence in Portugal. Naturalisation was extended automatically to a foreign woman who married a Portuguese man. The 1867 code also updated the 1836 wording on naturalisation conditions, to make it available to a person who was an adult, was financially self-sufficient, did not have a criminal record, had performed all military duties in the country of origin, and had three years of residence in Portugal (except for a person of Portuguese origin, having a Portuguese wife, or having accomplished certain actions).

Loss occurred with naturalisation in another country (but only for the individual concerned, not a wife or child unless they declared otherwise); accepting without permission a foreign government's public office, pension, or honors; expulsion by judicial decision; and marriage by a Portuguese woman to a foreign man if the woman acquired her husband's citizenship by marriage. Each was subject to different conditions on whether and how Portuguese citizenship could be reacquired at a later point.

=== Law 2098 of 29 July 1959 ===
Under the 1959 act, Portuguese citizenship was acquired automatically by persons born in Portuguese territory as long as the father was not foreign and in foreign government service, or, if the father was stateless, unknown, of unknown citizenship, as long as the mother was not foreign and in foreign government service.

Citizenship by descent was only automatic for a child born abroad to a Portuguese father or a Portuguese mother who was abroad for Portuguese government service. Otherwise it required either declaration of option for Portuguese nationality, registration in the Portuguese Register of Births, or residence in Portuguese territory with declaration. The government maintained the right to oppose this grant. A foreign woman who married a Portuguese man would automatically acquire Portuguese nationality unless she declared otherwise and proved that her own country's legislation would not remove her citizenship.

Discretionary naturalisation was largely the same as in the 1867 civil code as amended by a 1910 decree. Residency and language requirements were absolutely waived for descendants of Portuguese citizens, and the requirements could also be waived for foreign men who married Portuguese women or those who had performed notable service to Portugal. Naturalisation could also be granted by the government to foreigners from communities with Portuguese ancestors.

Loss could occur by voluntary acquisition of foreign citizenship (if not voluntary, loss could be pursued by the Portuguese government if it wished), performing public office or military service in a foreign country of which that person was not also a citizen, marriage by a Portuguese woman to a foreign man if she automatically obtained the husband's citizenship and did not declare her wish to the contrary or prevent acquisition, and renunciation. The Portuguese government cabinet also empowered the government to decree loss of citizenship for a person with dual citizenship who behaved only like a foreigner, who was convicted of a crime against Portugal's external security, or illicitly acted with a foreign country against Portugal's interests. The law again offered a variety of means to reacquire citizenship after loss.

=== Territorial changes ===
Portugal enacted Decree-Law 308-A/75 of 24 June 1974 to address the issue of losing or retaining Portuguese citizenship by those who had been born or were living in the Portuguese overseas territories which had gained independence. It was assumed that these persons would acquire the citizenship of the new state. The decree-law thus merely stipulated that Portuguese citizenship would be retained by those persons who had not been born overseas but were living there. In addition were those who, despite having been born in the territory of the colonies, had maintained a special connection with mainland Portugal by having been long-term residents there. All those not covered by one of the situations which enabled them to keep Portuguese citizenship would lose it ex lege.

Decree-Law 308/75 of 24 June 1975 was a response to the loss of Portuguese citizenship by many people born in former territories of Portugal in Africa and elsewhere that had acquired independence. It maintained Portuguese citizenship for persons who had not been born in those territories but were now living there, and those who maintained a connection with Portugal itself by long-term residence. The legislation was the source of confusion and object of criticism, for, among other reasons, its inherent removal of citizenship from some persons and its path to statelessness for others.

Special rules exist concerning the acquisition of Portuguese citizenship through connections with Angola, Brazil, Cape Verde, Goa, Guinea Bissau, Mozambique, Macau and São Tomé and Príncipe.

==== India ====
Portuguese India was taken by force with two military offensives in 1954 and 1961. Although most residents of these territories were given a choice between acquiring Indian citizenship and retaining their previous nationalities, those from Dadra and Nagar Haveli were not. In Goa, Daman and Diu, residents automatically became Indian citizens on 20 December 1961 unless they had made a written declaration before this date stating their intention to retain their existing nationality. Portugal did not recognise the annexation of its former Indian territories; persons born in Goa before 19 December 1961 were recognized as Portuguese citizens.

==== East Timor ====
East Timor was a territory of Portugal (Portuguese Timor) until its invasion by Indonesia in 1975, followed by annexation in 1976. Indonesian citizenship was conferred by Indonesia; however, while the Indonesian annexation was recognised by Australia and some other countries, Portugal did not recognise Indonesian sovereignty over East Timor. As a result, Decree-Law 308-A/75 of 24 June 1974 was not enforced to revoke the Timorese of their Portuguese nationality.

The question of whether East Timorese were entitled to Portuguese citizenship was raised on numerous occasions in the Australian courts in the context of applications for refugee status in Australia by East Timorese. The Australian immigration authorities argued that if East Timorese were Portuguese citizens, they should be expected to seek protection there and not in Australia.

In 1999, East Timor no longer remained a territory under Portuguese administration, which meant that children born in East Timor from then on were to be considered born abroad. Under Law 37/81, the attribution of Portuguese citizenship by origin to persons born in East Timor to a Portuguese parent is now dependent upon registration at the Portuguese civil registry or, alternatively, upon declaration of the will to be Portuguese.

Owing to the lack of employment opportunities in their country and the becoming a member of Community of Portuguese Language Countries, many East Timorese have taken advantage of Portuguese citizenship to live and work in Portugal and other EU countries.

==== Macau ====
The former Portuguese territory of Macau became a special administrative region of the People's Republic of China on 20 December 1999.

Portugal had extended its nationality laws to Macau with those born before 1981 acquiring nationality by jus soli and by jus sanguinis after 1981. Many residents of Macau (either of Chinese or Portuguese descent) hold Portuguese citizenship on this basis. It is no longer possible to acquire Portuguese citizenship by connection with Macau before 3 October 1981 and after 20 December 1999 transfer of sovereignty to China, except by birth or association with the territory previous to that date.

However, those born after 20 December 1999 to Portuguese from Macau or Macanese that hold Portuguese citizenship, and/or to Chinese who hold Portuguese citizenship, are eligible to the citizenship themselves due to the Portuguese heritage law (jus sanguinis), except when born to Chinese and/or Portuguese parents who possess Chinese citizenship after 20 December 1999 or when Chinese and/or Portuguese couple with Portuguese citizenship renounced their nationality by naturalisation after 20 December 1999.

=== Restrictions to birthright citizenship ===
Versions of the still current Decree-Law 37/81 of 3 October 1981 as amended at any date up to the present are available by entering the date in the official Portuguese legislation Web site.

The Portuguese Constitution of 1976 introduced the principles of non-discrimination on the basis of sex and marital status of parents at birth, and a fundamental right to citizenship. The political parties of Portugal agreed that new nationality legislation was required to achieve compatibility with the constitution, and finally approved it in 1981.

The 1981 law responded to the dramatic decrease in size of Portugal because of decolonisation, and the resulting need to increase the number of Portuguese citizens—although notably not attempting to include African and other non-European-origin Portuguese speakers of former Portuguese territories—because of the flow of emigrants leaving Portugal in recent decades (an emigrant population estimated at more than four million) and the desire to retain ties with those emigrants' children and grandchildren as a resource to the Portuguese state. The center-right governing coalition viewed it as very important to create changes that would facilitate Portuguese citizenship for emigrants and their descendants because Portugal had become a small country with widespread emigration and needed to make the best of the situation.

Jus sanguinis was still by either expression of intent or registration of birth in the Portuguese civil register, but was modernised to allow it to flow through either a Portuguese mother or father. To help prevent further reduction in Portuguese citizen numbers and to recognise the fundamental citizenship right, citizenship loss could only be accomplished voluntarily, and multiple citizenship was fully tolerated, and renunciation of other citizenships was not required to acquire Portuguese citizenship.

Jus soli citizenship, in contrast, was restricted to require expression of intent and either of the parents having lived in Portugal for at least six years beforehand.

As part of the modernization, automatic acquisition of Portuguese citizenship by a woman marrying a Portuguese man was ended, and became simply one of the grounds on which naturalisation could be requested. The ability for persons who had previously lost citizenship due to marriage or voluntary acquisition of foreign citizenship to reacquire Portuguese citizenship was introduced.

=== European integration ===
In 1986, Portugal joined the European Communities (EC), a set of organisations that later developed into the European Union (EU). Portuguese citizens have since been able to work in other EC/EU countries under the freedom of movement for workers established by the 1957 Treaty of Rome and participated in their first European Parliament elections in 1987. With the creation of European Union citizenship by the 1992 Maastricht Treaty, free movement rights were extended to all nationals of EU member states regardless of their employment status. The scope of these rights was further expanded with the establishment of the European Economic Area in 1994 to include any national of an EFTA member state except for Switzerland, which concluded a separate free movement agreement with the EU that came into force in 2002.

=== Law 25/94 of 1994 ===
In response to an increase in the 1990s of unlawful immigration into Portugal, the governing coalition amended the 1981 act by limiting jus soli and naturalisation. For jus soli, the parents were now required not only to reside in Portugal, but to hold a residence permit—and the work permit or permit of stay possessed by a large percentage of foreigners living in Portugal would not be sufficient. If the parents were not from a Lusophone country, the minimum period of residence was increased from six year to 10 years.

A person married to a Portuguese citizen was now required to be married for at least three years before acquiring citizenship, and was required to carry the burden of proof of showing an effective link to the Portuguese community.

=== Organic Law 1/2004 ===
To reduce the effects of some earlier legislation on Portuguese emigrant communities, the law removed the power of the government to oppose reacquisition of nationality, made acquisition of Portuguese citizenship automatic if the loss of nationality had not been registered, and made reacquisition retroactive to the date of loss. That opened the doors for children born abroad of Portuguese emigrants to more easily acquire citizenship by descent.

=== Organic Law 2/2006 ===
The election of a Socialist Party-led government in 2005 gave rise to the passage of a bill to modernize Portuguese nationality law, in recognition of the impact of years of immigration into the country.

The objectives were to integrate second- and third- generation immigrants who did not have citizenship, to comply with judicial and legal demands that the nationality law be consistent with the European Convention of Nationality and its non-discrimination clauses, and to lessen confusion of outdated wording and definitions that relied on simple regulation instead of law.

To do so, the law eliminated some requirements for naturalisation (such as proving a link to the Portuguese community and minimum subsistence requirements), clarified others (changing ambiguous requirements of moral and social behavior to a requirement of no conviction for a crime carrying a prison sentence of at least three years in Portugal), and reduced some (minimum residency was uniformly lessened to six years).

Double jus soli was introduced, with citizenship automatically extended to individuals with a parent also born in Portuguese territory who resided there at the time of the child's birth. The effect is retroactive.

Citizenship was also made available, by declaration, to individuals born in Portuguese territory to foreign parents if at least one parent had legally resided in Portugal for at least five years.

Naturalisation for children was made available to those who had a parent who resided legally in Portugal for at least five years or who completed the first cycle of basic education.

=== Organic Law 9/2015 ===
This law enabled grandchildren of Portuguese citizens, include those born abroad prior to entry into force, to acquire Portuguese citizenship, if they have verified ties to the Portuguese community, the birth is registered in the Portuguese civil registry, and the grandchild declares the preference for Portuguese nationality.

=== Organic Law 2/2018 ===
The 2018 law further expanded a number of the allowances created in the 2006 law.

It reduced the minimum time of a parent's residence in Portugal, while not in foreign government service, from five years to two years for the child born in Portugal to automatically receive citizenship at birth. It did the same for a child seeking naturalisation, while also allowing a child's naturalisation if the parent was resident unlawfully.

=== Recent changes ===
As of May 2015, under the newly approved Portuguese Nationality Act (Article 1, n.1, paragraph d) persons born abroad with, at least, one Portuguese ascendant in the second degree of the direct line who has not lost this citizenship, are Portuguese by origin, provided that they declare that they want to be Portuguese, that they have effective ties with the national community and, once these requirements are met, that are only required to register their birth in any Portuguese civil registry.

Portuguese nationality law was amended in 2006 based on the proposals of deputy Neves Moreira, member of the Democratic Social Party (PSD): a foreign-born person whose grandparent never lost Portuguese citizenship became able to request naturalisation without the need to document 6 years residence in Portugal.

Because nationality acquired through naturalisation is not the same as nationality acquired through descent, members of the PSD proposed in 2009 another change in the law. This proposal would have given nationality by origin (descent) rather than by naturalisation to the grandchildren of Portuguese citizens but it was rejected. In 2013, members of the PSD tried to pass a similar measure again but due to the political and economic crisis that engulfed the country, no vote was ever taken on the measure.

=== 2026 reform ===
On 3 May 2026, President António José Seguro promulgated a revision to the Nationality Law that doubles the standard naturalisation residency requirement from five to ten years, while citizens of EU member states and CPLP nations face a seven-year requirement. The residency clock starts when the AIMA issues a residence permit, rather than at the date of application. The revision had been approved by parliament on 1 April 2026 with the votes of the PSD and Chega.

== Acquisition and loss of citizenship ==
=== Entitlement by birth, descent, or adoption ===
All persons born in Portuguese territory (including Macao) before 3 October 1981 automatically received citizenship at birth regardless of the nationalities of their parents. Individuals born domestically since that date receive Portuguese citizenship at birth if at least one parent is a Portuguese citizen. Stateless children born in the country automatically become citizens with no further requirements. Adopted children of Portuguese citizens automatically acquire citizenship on completion of the adoption process.

=== Five Year Residency Requirement of Parents ===
Children born in the country to noncitizens are eligible to make a voluntary declaration of intent to acquire Portuguese citizenship if at least one parent has been resident in Portuguese territory for a minimum requisite period. Currently, as of 2026, a child born in Portugal can receive Portuguese citizenship if either parent is a resident of Portugal - legal or otherwise - for a minimum of 5 years since 2026

Between 1981 and 1994, a parent was required to have resided in Portuguese territory for at least six years before their child's birth. This was increased to 10 years for foreign parents from non-Lusophone countries between 1994 and 2006. Since 2006, this residence requirement has been lowered to five years for parents from any foreign country.

Individuals born overseas to a Portuguese parent are eligible to acquire citizenship by descent if their births are registered at a Portuguese diplomatic mission or if they register as citizens at any later point. Grandchildren of Portuguese citizens may also acquire citizenship by descent with additional requirements; they are required to formally declare their intention of becoming Portuguese, prove substantial ties with the nation, and register their births in the national registry.

=== Voluntary acquisition ===
Since the publication of the amendments to the nationality law which came into force on 19 May 2026, foreigners over the age of 18 may become Portuguese citizens by naturalisation after residing legally in Portugal for a minimum of 10 years. These applicants must also demonstrate proficiency in the Portuguese language as well as undergo a civic knowledge test. Persons from other European Union countries or Lusophone (CPLP) countries can get citizenship after 7 years of legal residence. Citizenship applicants who were granted a Golden Visa can calculate their time of residency based on the date their residence permit was issued and not when they applied. Any person convicted of a crime resulting in imprisonment for more than three years or who otherwise presents a threat to national defence is barred from naturalising. Noncitizen minors born in Portugal who meet the language and behaviour requirements are eligible for naturalisation provided that they have also completed at least one cycle of domestic primary or secondary education and have at least one parent who has resided in the country for the previous five years, regardless of their legal residence status. All other noncitizens born in Portugal to a parent who was residing in the country at the time of their births and who have themselves resided in Portugal for at least five years prior to application are eligible for naturalisation. Individuals who are married to Portuguese citizens may acquire citizenship by declaration after three years of marriage.

=== Loss and resumption ===
Portuguese citizenship can be relinquished by making a declaration of renunciation, provided that the declarant already possesses another nationality. It cannot be involuntarily stripped by the government in any situation, and may not be renounced if loss of citizenship would make a person stateless. Under circumstances where birth records were forged to acquire Portuguese citizenship, the nullification of an affected individual's citizenship would not be treated as loss of that status, but that the individual had never acquired it from birth.

Former citizens who lost citizenship while they were children may apply to reacquire citizenship. Reacquisition can be formally opposed by the Public Prosecution Service within one year of an application, but is otherwise granted after expiration of that period. Women who lost Portuguese citizenship by marriage to foreign men are able to able to apply for reacquisition without being subject to the non-opposition requirement. Any person who previously lost citizenship on their acquisition of another nationality automatically had their Portuguese citizenship restored in 1981, unless that loss had been registered with the Portuguese government. If their loss was recorded, that affected individual is eligible to apply for reacquisition without opposition from authorities.

=== Jewish Law of Return ===
This route to nationality has been completely stopped by the enactment of the new Nationality Law in May 2026. The law used to work as follows, an amendment to Portugal's 'Law on Nationality' allowed descendants of Portuguese Jews who were expelled in the Portuguese Inquisition to become citizens if they 'belong to a Sephardic community of Portuguese origin with ties to Portugal.' In 2020 there were reports that changes to the Law of Return were proposed which would restrict eligibility for citizenship to people who had lived in Portugal for two years. The restrictions were rejected by the ruling Socialist party and did not become law at the time.

The Portuguese parliament passed legislation facilitating the naturalisation of descendants of 16th-century Jews who fled because of religious persecution. On that day Portugal became the only country besides Israel enforcing a Jewish Law of Return. Two years later, Spain adopted a similar measure.

The motion, which was submitted by the Socialist and Center Right parties, was read on Thursday 11 April 2013 in parliament and approved unanimously on Friday 12 April 2013 as an amendment to Portugal's "Law on Nationality" (Decree-Law n.º 43/2013). Portuguese nationality law was further amended to this effect by Decree-Law n.º 30-A/2015, which came into effect on 1 March 2015.

The amended law allows descendants of Jews who were expelled in the 16th century to become citizens if they "belong to a Sephardic community of Portuguese origin with ties to Portugal," according to José Oulman Carp, president of Lisbon's Jewish community. The website of the World Jewish Congress says that the Jewish Community of Lisbon is the organization that unites local communal groups of Lisbon and its environs, while the Jewish Community of Porto is the organization that unites local communal groups of Porto.

Applicants must be able to prove a Sephardic line in their family tree. Another factor is "the language spoken at home," a reference which also applies to Ladino (Judeo-Portuguese and/or Judeo-Spanish). Furthermore, applicants must be able to prove an "emotional and traditional connection with the former Portuguese Sephardic Community," commonly established through a letter from an Orthodox rabbi confirming Jewish heritage. The amendment also says applicants need not reside in Portugal, an exception to the requirement of six years of consecutive residency in Portugal for any applicant for citizenship.

From 2015 several hundred Turkish Jews who were able to prove Sephardi ancestry have immigrated to Portugal and acquired citizenship. Nearly 1,800 descendants of Sephardic Jews acquired Portuguese nationality in 2017. By February 2018, 12,000 applications were in process, and 1,800 applicants had been granted Portuguese citizenship in 2017. By July 2019 there had been about 33,000 applications, of which about a third had already been granted after a long process of verification. By November 2020 Portugal had granted citizenship to about 23,000 people, about 30% of the roughly 76,000 applications submitted since 2015; the number was stated as 56,685 granted, with 80,102 pending, at the end of January 2022. As of January 2023, the number of pending cases was reported to be over 300,000.

After some notorious cases where it was reported that people without a valid claim had been granted citizenship, with falsification of documents and other misdeeds, the Portuguese government on 9 March 2022 implemented a decree-law to increase scrutiny of candidates, who will have to prove an "effective connection with Portugal". Among cases being investigated was that of Russian billionaire Roman Abramovich, although it was not expected that changes would be retroactive for people already granted citizenship.

== See also ==
- Institute of Registries and Notary
- Portuguese passport
- Identity card (Portugal)
- Visa policy of the Schengen Area
- Visa requirements for Portuguese citizens
