= Identity card (Portugal) =

Identity document of Portugal

Identity Card (Cartão de cidadão)
- Front of a Cartão de Cidadão

- Reverse of a Cartão de Cidadão issued to a Portuguese citizen
- Type: Compulsory identity document
- Issued by: Institute of Registries and Notary
- Valid in: European Union and the rest of Europe (except Belarus, Russia, Ukraine and United Kingdom) Egypt; Georgia; Montserrat (max. 14 days); Overseas France; Turkey
- Eligibility: Portuguese citizenship or Brazilian citizenship under Brazil and Portugal's special relationship
- Expiration: 10 years (age 25 or over); 5 years (age under 25)

The Portuguese identity card (Portuguese: Cartão de cidadão, CC) (lit. 'Citizen card'), is an identity document issued by the Government of Portugal to its citizens. The card replaces several previous documents, including the Bilhete de Identidade (BI; Identity Card), Social Security card, National Health Service card, Taxpayer card and voter registration card, in one secure card. The Citizen Card was first issued in the Azores in mid-2006. However, as of 2017 BIs continued to be issued in some cases.

It is mandatory to have a card from twenty days after birth.

The Citizen card is also a valid travel document within all of Europe, including the United Kingdom in some cases, and except Belarus, Russia and Ukraine. It is also valid in Egypt, French overseas territories, Georgia, Montserrat (max 14 days) and Turkey. However, to enter Egypt a visa is required through the e-visa system or upon arrival (passport photo is required on the arrival).

In March 2024, it was announced that the new EU and ICAO compliant biometric ID cards (Regulation (EU) 2019/1157), with contactless capability, were to be issued starting on 10 June 2024. In June 2024, the Portuguese government started issuing the biometric identity card to its citizens.

== History ==
The main reason to introduce the new card was to reduce the number of separate documents required by citizens in dealings with the various institutions of the state. The CC is a smart card with a data storage chip capable of storing encrypted personal data. According to the Portuguese government, this device guarantees its privacy: for example, stored medical information cannot be accessed by officials with access to the financial database of the citizen, to prevent abuse of power in obtaining data and protecting citizens' privacy.

Another problem with the Bilhete de Identidade was that it was widely counterfeited. In addition to introducing the newer, more secure, CC, from 2008 identity documents could no longer be issued by Portuguese consulates as previously; identity documents could only be issued in Lisbon (although applied for elsewhere).

== Other identity documents ==
In many circumstances, a passport or driver's license can still be used as an identification document. However, the "identity card" or "citizen card" is required by the Portuguese authorities. Foreigners, including European Union nationals, must carry a passport or valid identity card of their country of origin, and show it whenever required by officials. In the future however, as part of the Simplex + 2018, a new "card of citizenship" (cartão de cidadão) for foreigners residing in Portugal will arrive, which will include tax identification, social security and the national health system.

== Appearance ==
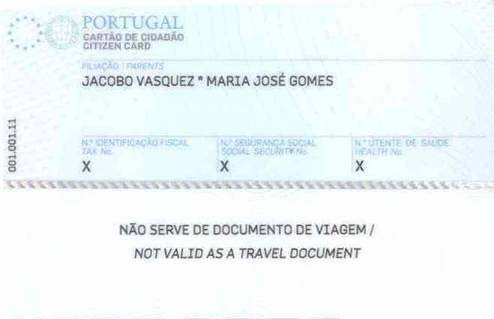
Reverse of a Cartão de Cidadão issued to a Stateless Person (old model)

The card is of similar size and appearance to a credit card. It contains a variety of information about the card holder.

The front of the card

- Card holder's photo
- Surname(s)
- Given Name(s)
- Sex
- Height
- Nationality
- Date of Birth
- Civil Identification Number
- Document number
- Expiry Date
- Card holder's signature

The back of the card

- Filiation
- Tax number
- Social Security number
- National Health Service number
- Optical reading area

On the chip

- Digital certificates (card's authentication and electronic signature)
- Same data as the optical reading area but in digital format
- Address and other information (the system is expandable)

== Holders in Macau ==
Macau, formerly a Portuguese colony, still has over 168,000 residents with Portuguese citizenship cards, which give them the same rights as people living in mainland Portugal. This means that holders in Macau can travel and work freely in the Schengen Area and benefit from social welfare in Portugal.

Portuguese nationality can be inherited, which is why the number of Portuguese citizens in Macau has not seen a significant decline since the transfer of sovereignty. This is in contrast to the U.K.'s British National (Overseas) passport for Hong Kong residents, which offers limited rights and does not grant residency in the United Kingdom. While Portugal's constitution avoids making distinctions between its citizens, U.K. law permits such classifications.

Macau residents with Portuguese nationality often retain it primarily because the Portuguese passport allows visa-free travel to over 191 countries or regions. In contrast, the Macau Special Administrative Region passport grants visa-free access to only 144 countries or regions.

Holders in Macau can renew their citizenship cards at the Consulate General of Portugal in Macau and Hong Kong, which is centrally located on the Macau Peninsula. For these cardholders, the Tax No., Social Security No., and Health number have a cross (X) marked on the back of the card if they have never obtained those number.

== Issuance to Brazilian nationals ==
Since the conclusion of the Equality Statute between Brazil and Portugal (Estatuto da Igualdade entre Brasil e Portugal) between the two nations at Porto Seguro on 21 April 2001, Portuguese and Brazilian citizens are considered to have identical rights and privileges across both countries. Accordingly, a Brazilian national may apply for and be issued Citizen Card in the same style as would be issued to a Portuguese national, except that the "Nacionalidade" (nationality) field shows "BRA" to indicate the bearer's Brazilian citizenship, and the back of the card carries the supplementary remark "CIDADÃO BRASILEIRO AO ABRIGO DO TRATADO DE PORTO SEGURO - BRAZILIAN CITIZEN UNDER PORTO SEGURO AGREEMENT".

Additionally, because Brazilian citizenship alone is not sufficient to allow a person to make use of the European Union's provisions for the freedom of personal movement, these Citizen Cards are marked "NÃO SERVE DE DOCUMENTO DE VIAGEM / NOT VALID AS A TRAVEL DOCUMENT", instead of the machine-readable zone that would be found on a Portuguese citizen's card.

== See also ==
- Bilhete de Identidade
- Portuguese passport
- Institute of Registries and Notary
- National identity cards in the European Economic Area
- Portuguese nationality law
