= Portuguese Brazilians =

Brazilian individuals from Portugal

Portuguese Brazilians Luso-brasileiros
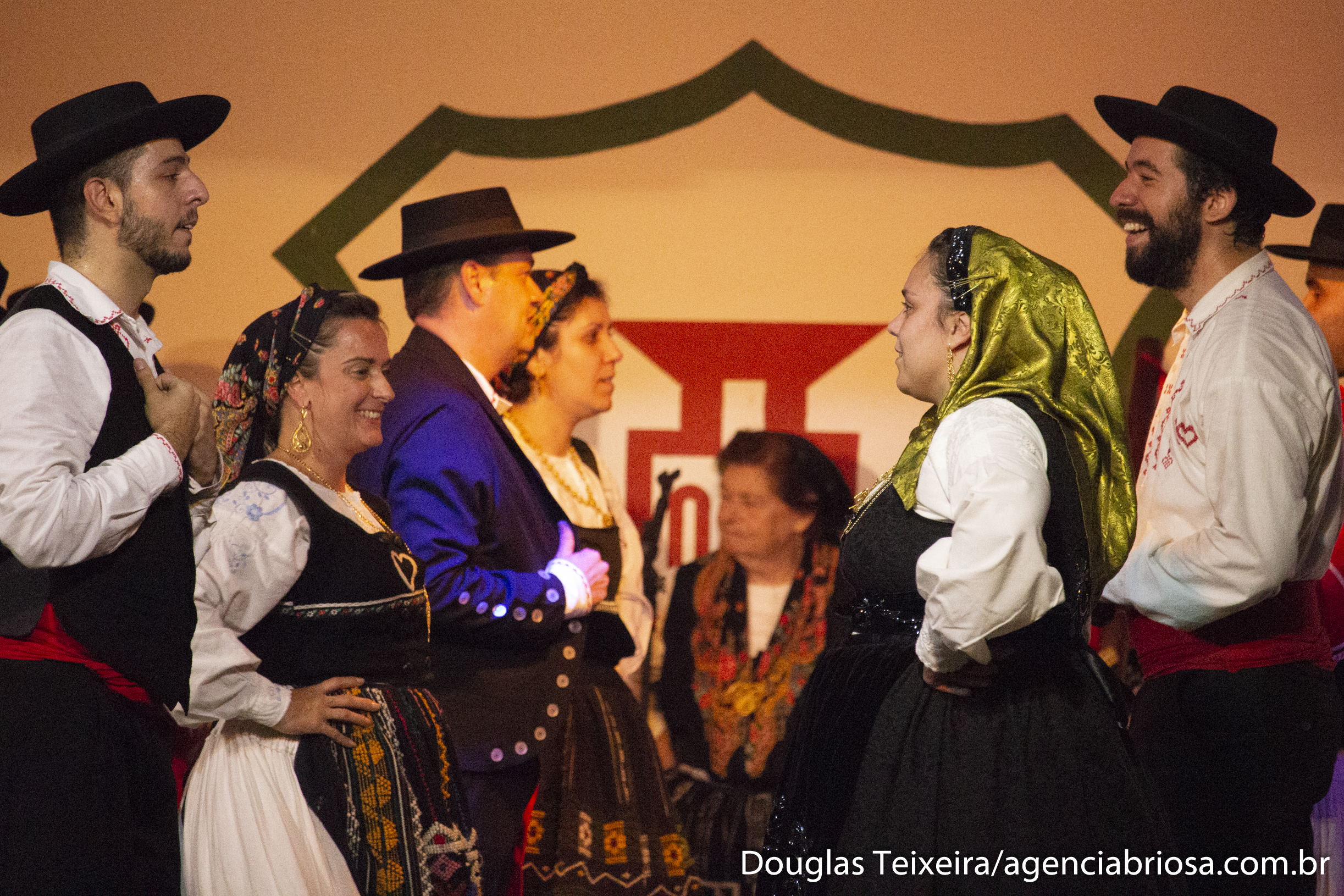
- Brazilians of Portuguese descent in Santos

Total population
- 5 million Brazilians (2.5% of the population) have recent Portuguese ancestry (at least one grandparent) and are eligible to obtain Portuguese citizenship. Exact number of Brazilians with Portuguese ancestry unknown due to many having ancestry going back to Portuguese settlers.

Regions with significant populations
- All of Brazil

Languages
- Portuguese (European and Brazilian)

Religion
- Primarily Roman Catholicism: minorities of Protestantism; Pentecostalism; Evangelicalism; Atheism; Spiritism; Japanese new religions; Judaism; Others

Related ethnic groups
- Portuguese; European Brazilians; Sephardim; Lusophones; Spanish Brazilians; Italian Brazilians; Afro-Brazilians; Pardo; French Brazilians

Portuguese Brazilians (Portuguese: luso-brasileiros) are Brazilian citizens whose ancestry originates wholly or partly in Portugal. Most of the Portuguese who arrived throughout the centuries in Brazil sought economic opportunities. Although present since the onset of the colonization, Portuguese people began migrating to Brazil in larger numbers and without state support in the 18th century.

== The Portuguese prerogative ==
According to the Constitution of Brazil, the Portuguese people have a special status in Brazil. Article 12, first paragraph of the Constitution, grants to citizens of Portugal with permanent residence in Brazil "the rights attached to Brazilians", excluded from the constitutional prerogatives of Brazilian born. Requirements for the granting of equality are: habitual residence (permanent), the age of majority and formulation of request from the Minister of Justice.

In Brazil, the Portuguese may require equal treatment with regard to civil rights; moreover, they may ask to be granted political rights granted to Brazilians (except the rights exclusive to the Brazilian born). In the latter case, this requires a minimum of three years of permanent residence.

The use of citizenship by non-Brazilian nationals (in this case, Portuguese) is a rare exception to the principle that nationality is a sine qua non for citizenship, granted to the Portuguese – if with reciprocal treatment for the Brazilians in Portugal – due to the historic relationship between the two countries.

== History ==
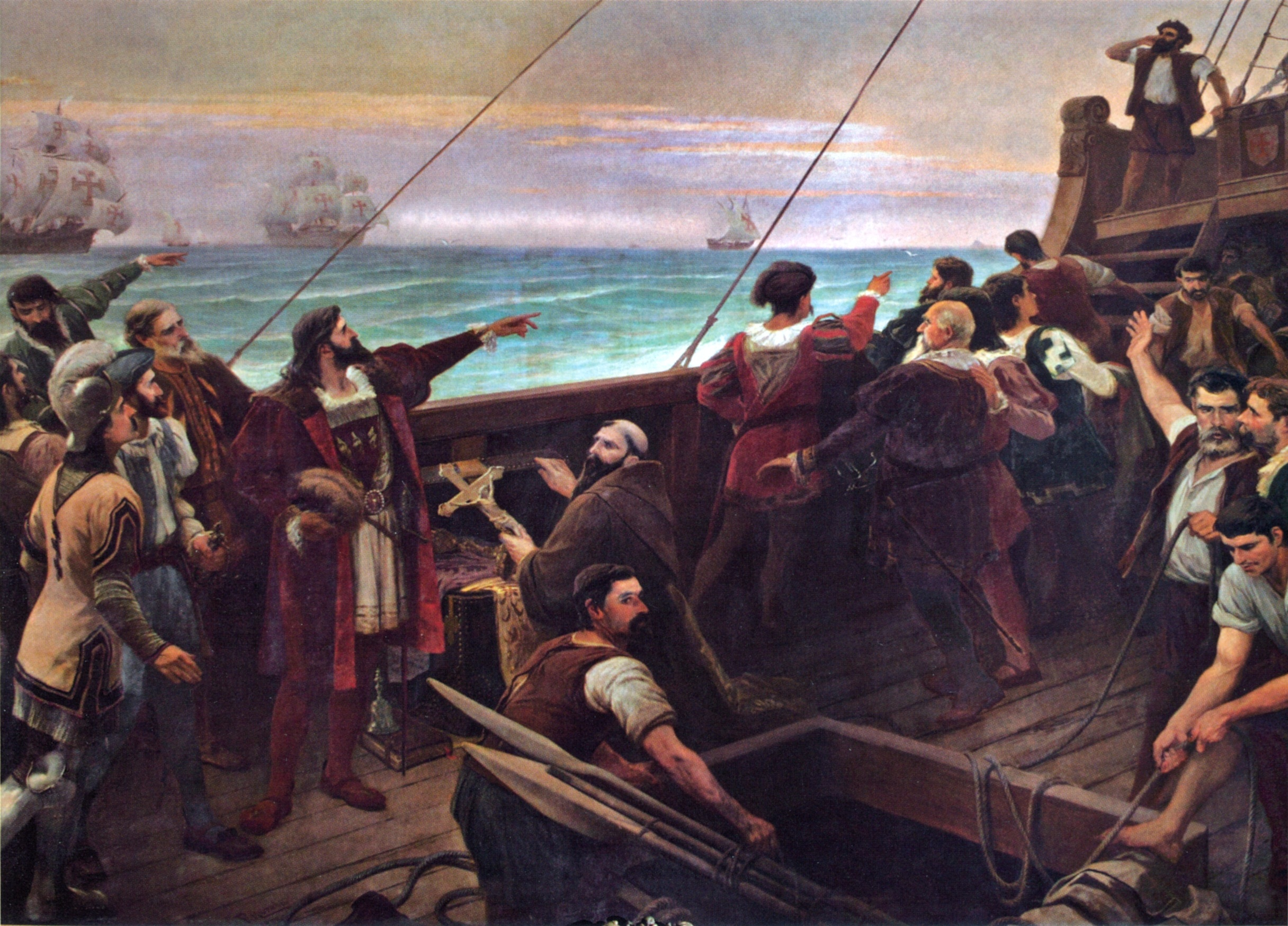
Portuguese explorer Pedro Álvares Cabral (center-left, pointing) sights the Brazilian mainland for the first time on 22 April 1500.

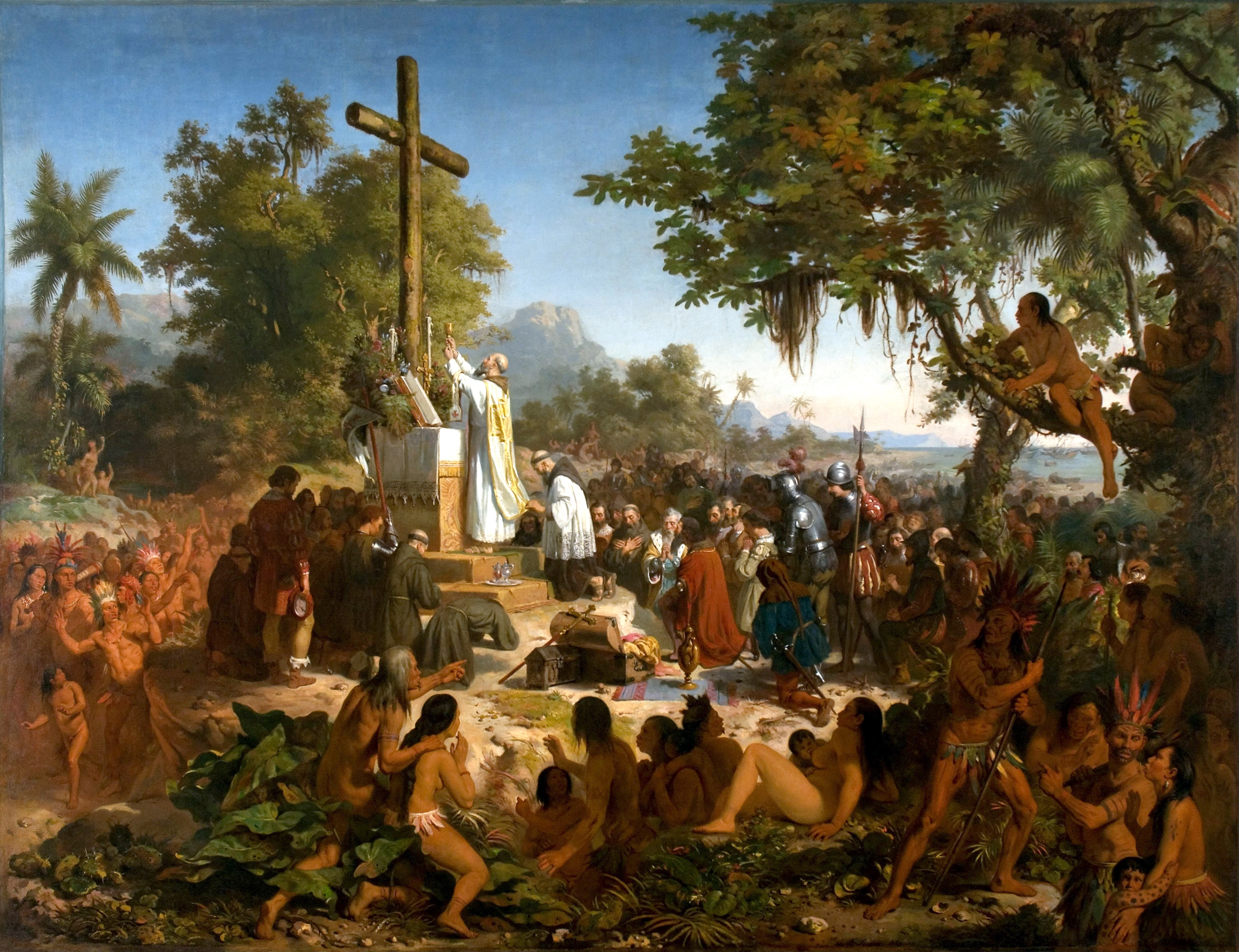
The first Mass in Brazil among the native Indians on 26 April 1500. Painting by Victor Meirelles (1860).

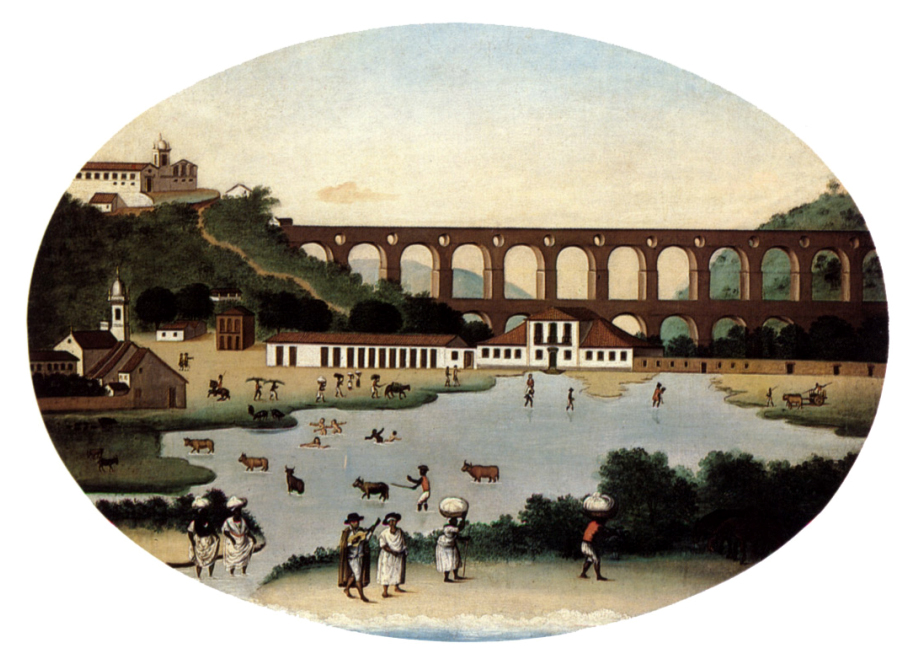
Carioca Aqueduct in Rio de Janeiro as depicted by Leandro Joaquim (1790).

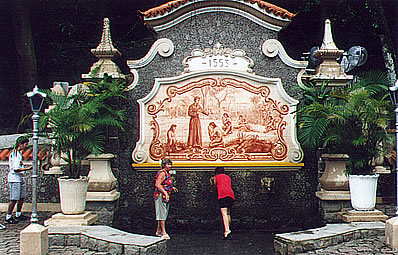
Existing since 1553, the Biquinha of Anchieta was one of the main water sources of the population of the city of São Vicente, State of São Paulo, through the centuries.

=== Early settlement and colonization (1500–1700) ===
Some of the earliest colonists for whom we have written records are João Ramalho and Diogo Álvares Correia. At the time the Portuguese Crown was focused on securing its highly lucrative Portuguese Empire in Asia, and so did little to protect the newly discovered lands in the Americas from foreign interlopers. As a result, many pirates, mainly French, began dealing in pau brasil with the Amerindians. This situation worried Portugal, which in the 1530s started to encourage the colonization of Brazil, principally for defensive reasons. The towns of Cananéia (1531), São Vicente (1532), Porto Seguro (1534) and Iguape (1538) date from that period.

By the mid-16th century, Portuguese colonists were already settling in significant numbers, mainly along the coastal regions of Brazil. Numerous cities were established, including Salvador (1549), São Paulo (1554) and Rio de Janeiro (1565). While most Portuguese (and predominantly male) settlers came willingly, some were forced exiles or degredados. Such convicts were sentenced for a variety of crimes according to the Ordenações do Reino, which included common theft, attempted murder and adultery.

During the 17th century, most Portuguese settlers in Brazil, who throughout the entire colonial period tended to originate from Northern Portugal, moved to the northeastern part of the country to establish the first sugar plantations. Some of the new arrivals were New Christians, that is, descendants of Portuguese Jews who had been induced to convert to Catholicism and remained in Portugal, yet were often targeted by the Inquisition (established in 1536) under the accusation of being crypto-Jews.

=== Azoreans in Maranhão, Pará and Amapá ===
There was concern in keeping the control of the territory, hence the policy in promoting the colonization with couples in the border lands. The occupation of the territory was seen as essential. In 1619, about 300 couples arrived in Maranhão, the total number of people being around 1000 individuals, a significant number for that time. Maranhão is the first region to receive Azorean settlers in an organised way. Beyond the initial settling in 1619, led by Estácio da Silveira in 1619, others followed: in 1621 arrived 40 couples with Antonio Ferreira de Bettencourt and Jorge de Lemos Bettencourt, in 1625 other couples came with Francisco Coelho de Carvalho; in the ships "N. S. da Palma" and "São Rafael", 50 couples arrived; in the ships "N. S. da Penha de França" and "São Francisco Xavier" more settlers came. Throughout the 17th century, successive waves of Azorean couples were settled in Maranhão.

Azorean couples were also settled in Pará, an example of this being the 50 couples (or around 219 individuals) who embarked on 29 March 1677, in the ship "Jesus, Maria e "José", in Horta, Faial. In 1676, 50 Azorean couples with 234 people of both sexes landed in Belém, coming from Feiteira, Faial.

In 1751 Macapá in Amapá received Azoreans and it was recommended to the captain of the ship to have a special care with the settlers, since "for the most part they were women, children and older people."

=== Growing Portuguese migrants (1700–1822) ===
In the 18th century, immigration to Brazil from Portugal increased dramatically. Immigrants to Brazil departed from Portugal via the ports of Lisbon (Leixões), Porto, and Funchal on Madeira. Two British companies provided the bulk of transport of passengers in this period: the Companhia Marítima Mala Real Britânica and later the Companhia de Navegação do Pacifico. Many gold and diamond mines were discovered in the region of Minas Gerais, which then led to the arrival of not only Portuguese, but also of native-born Brazilians. Regarding the former, most were peasants from the Minho region in Portugal. In the beginning, Portugal stimulated the immigration of minhotos to Brazil. After some time, however, the number of departures was so great that the Portuguese Crown had to establish barriers to further immigration. Most of these Portuguese involved in the goldrush ended up settling in Minas Gerais and in the Center-West region of Brazil, where they founded dozens of cities such as Ouro Preto, Congonhas, Mariana, São João del Rei, Tiradentes, Goiás, etc.

In the words of Simão Ferreira Machado, in Triunfo Eucarístico, published in Lisbon in 1734, "half of Portugal was transplanted" to Brazil at that time.

Official estimates – and most estimates made so far – place the number of Portuguese migrants to Colonial Brazil during the gold rush of the 18th century at 600,000. Though not usually studied, this represented one of the largest movements of European populations to their colonies to the Americas during the colonial times. According to historian Leslie Bethell, "In 1700 Portugal had a population of about two million people." During the 18th century hundreds of thousands left for the Portuguese Colony of Brazil, despite efforts by the crown to place severe restrictions on emigration.

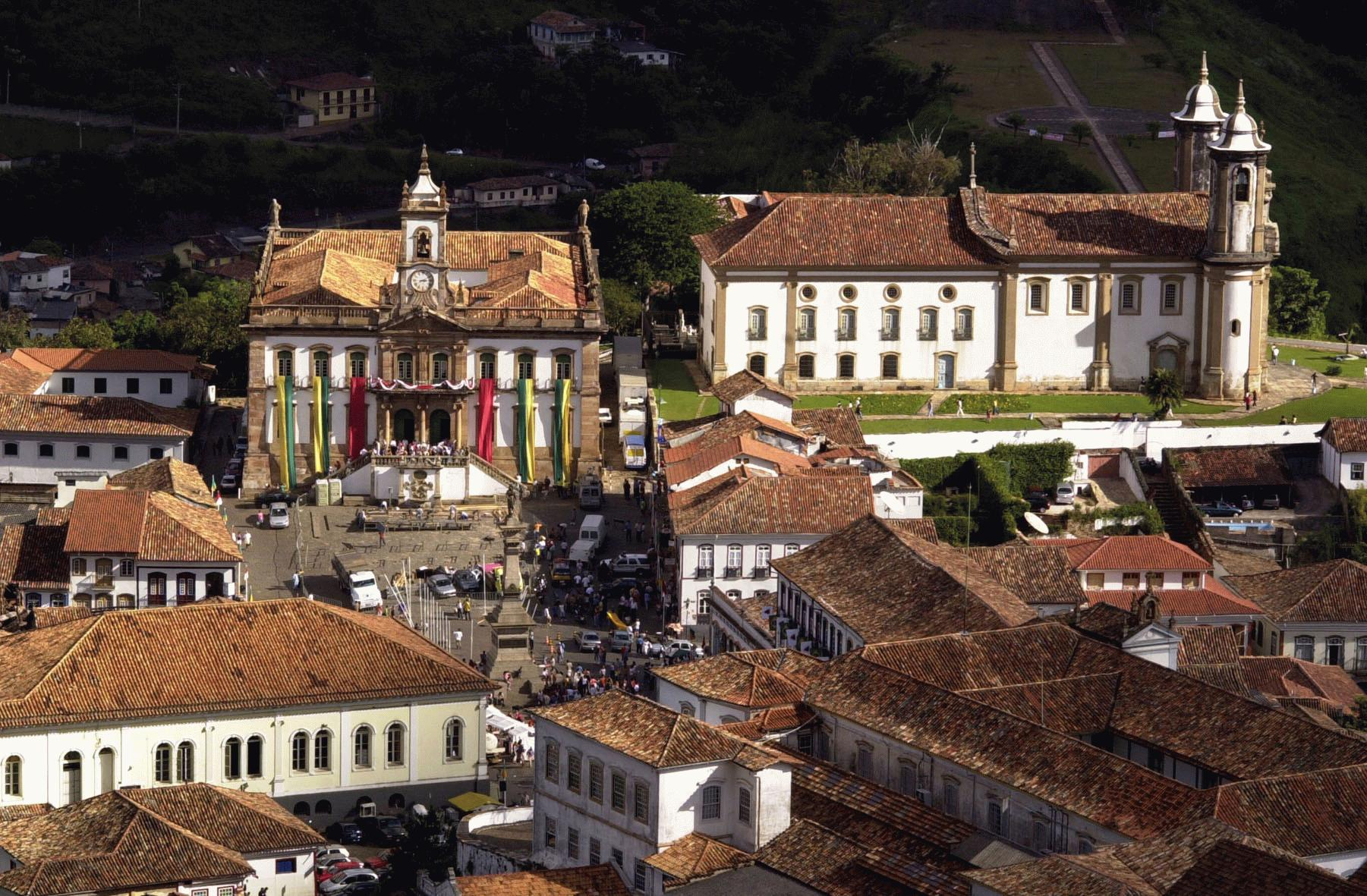
Ouro Preto, Minas Gerais an 18th-century colonial city and UNESCO World Heritage Site.

Between 1748 and 1756, 7,817 settlers from the Azores Islands arrived in Santa Catarina, located in the Southern Region of Brazil. Several hundred couples of Azoreans also settled in Rio Grande do Sul. The majority of those colonists, composed of small farmers and fishermen, settled along the litoral of those two states and founded the cities of Florianópolis and Porto Alegre. Unlike previous trends, in the south entire Portuguese families came to seek a better life for themselves, not just men. During this period, the number of Portuguese women in Brazil increased, which resulted in a larger white population. This was especially true in Southern Brazil.

A significant immigration of very rich Portuguese to Brazil occurred in 1808, when Queen Maria I of Portugal and her son and regent, the future João VI of Portugal, fleeing from Napoleon's invading armies, relocated to the Portuguese Colony of Brazil with 15,000 members of the royal family, nobles and government, and established themselves in Rio de Janeiro. After the Portuguese military had successfully repelled Napoleon's invasion, King João VI returned to Europe on 26 April 1821, leaving his elder son Prince Pedro de Alcântara as regent to rule Brazil. The Portuguese government attempted to turn Brazil into a colony once again, thus depriving it of its achievements since 1808. The Brazilians refused to yield and Prince Pedro stood by them declaring the country's independence from Portugal on 7 September 1822. On 12 October 1822, Pedro was declared the first Emperor of Brazil and crowned Dom Pedro I on 1 December 1822. Thousands of ordinary Portuguese settlers left for Brazil after independence.

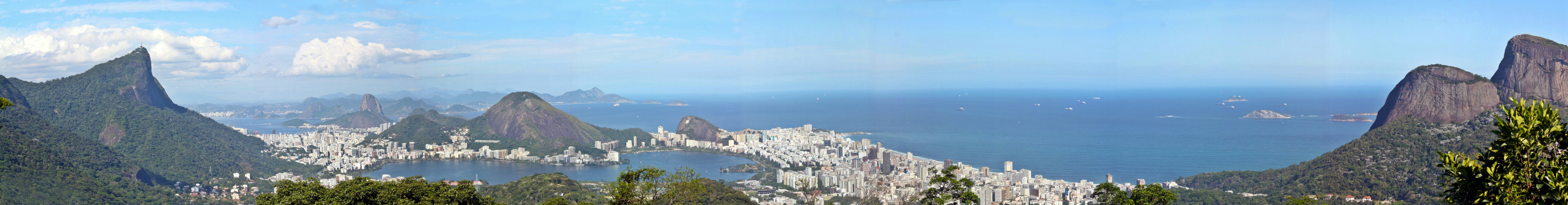
For thirteen years (1808–1821), Rio de Janeiro, Brazil, functioned as the capital of the Kingdom of Portugal in what some historians call a "metropolitan reversal" (i.e., a colony exercising governance over the entirety of the Portuguese empire.)

=== Portuguese immigration to Brazil (1822–1960) ===
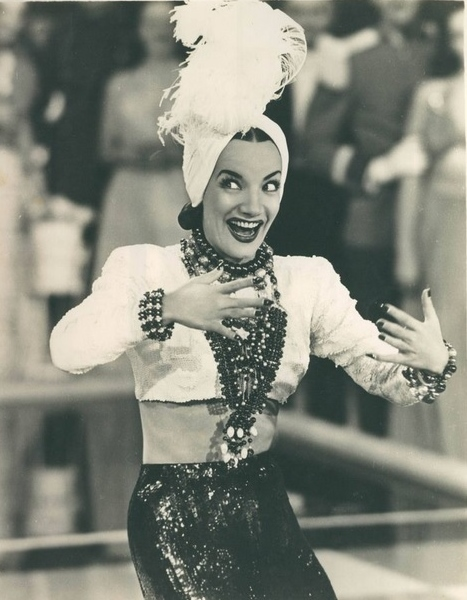
Singer Carmen Miranda, nicknamed "the Brazilian bombshell", was born in Portugal and emigrated with her family to Brazil in 1910, when she was ten months old.

A few years after independence from Portugal in 1822, Portuguese people would start arriving in Brazil as immigrants, and the Portuguese population in Brazil actually increased. Most of them were peasants from the rural areas of Portugal. The majority settled in urban centers, mainly in São Paulo and Rio de Janeiro, working mainly as small traders, shopkeepers, porters, cobblers, and drivers. A smaller number became coal miners, dairy workers, and small-scale farmers outside of urban areas. Portuguese immigrants also provided labor for the dredging of the Tietê River. Upheavals in Portugal after the 1910 Revolution and the establishment of the First Portuguese Republic caused a temporary exodus of Portuguese to Brazil. This wave of immigrants is noted for its establishments of bars, restaurants, bakeries, and small industries. The outbreak of World War I and the subsequent stock market crash of 1929 reduced the ability of the Portuguese to travel to Brazil.

The Portuguese and their descendants were quick to organize themselves and establish mutual aid societies (such as the Casas de Portugal), hospitals (e.g. Beneficência Portuguesa de São Paulo, Beneficência Portuguesa de Porto Alegre, Hospital Português de Salvador, Real Hospital Português do Recife, etc.), libraries (e.g. Real Gabinete Português de Leitura in Rio de Janeiro and in Salvador), newspapers (e.g. Jornal Mundo Lusíada), magazines (e.g. Revista Atlântico) and even sports clubs with football teams, including two regular contenders of the Brazilian Série A: the Club de Regatas Vasco da Gama in Rio de Janeiro and the Associação Portuguesa de Desportos in São Paulo. Other clubs include Associação Atlética Portuguesa in Rio de Janeiro, the Associação Atlética Portuguesa Santista in Santos, the Associação Portuguesa Londrinense in Londrina, the Tuna Luso Brasileira in Belém, and Associação Luso-Brasileira in Bauru.

=== Dwindling Portuguese immigration (1960–2009) ===
In the 1930s, the Brazilian President Getúlio Vargas established legislation that hindered the settlement of immigrants in Brazil. WWII reduced immigration from Europe to Brazil; after it, immigration grew again, but, with the completion of demographic transition in Europe, European emigration gradually dwindled. As this process in Portugal came later than elsewhere in Europe, Portuguese emigration diminished slowly; but it was also gradually redirected to North America and other European countries, particularly France.

However, between 1945 and 1963, during Salazar's dictatorship (Estado Novo), thousands of Portuguese citizens still emigrated to Brazil. Due to the independence of Portuguese overseas provinces after the Carnation Revolution in 1974, a new wave of Portuguese immigrants arrived in Brazil until the late 1970s as refugees from Portugal and the newly independent countries of Angola, and Mozambique.. This wave included Portuguese immigrants, including political refugees, who had previously been members of the Portuguese Estado Novo regime's elite, with a reputed background in politics, academics, business, and colonial administration in the days of the old regime. Portuguese settlers from the former colony Macau and the Eurasians called Macanese also moved to Brazil during the same period. The wave of Portuguese immigrants in the 1970 settled primarily in Rio de Janeiro, Porto Alegre, and the capitals of the states of northeast Brazil. António Champalimaud and Marcello Caetano are just a few of its most prominent examples.

Economic reasons, with others of social, religious and political nature, are the main cause for the large Portuguese diaspora in Brazil. The country received the majority of Portuguese immigrants in the world.

After Portugal's recovery from the effects of Salazarist dictatorship of the Estado Novo, the Portuguese Colonial War, and the turmoil of the Carnation Revolution, in the 1980s and 1990s with the growth of the Portuguese economy and a deeper European integration, very few Portuguese immigrants went to Brazil. From the 1980s to the 2000s, Portuguese emigrants mainly went to other states within the European Union, followed by Canada, the US, Venezuela and South Africa.

=== The Portuguese sovereign debt and Eurozone crisis (2009–present) ===
In the first six months of 2011, with the economic crisis in Portugal and several other European Union member states, including Spain, Italy, Ireland and Greece, a record number of 328,826 Portuguese citizens made their situation regular in Brazil. One of the reasons which explained this rise in Portuguese immigration to Brazil was the economic crisis in Portugal, where unemployment rate rose to over 12.5%. In that period, the Portuguese lead the numbers of foreigners making their situation regular in Brazil. This wave differentiates from the two previous waves by the higher education level of the new Portuguese emigrants, which represents an effective brain drain since large numbers of highly qualified and experienced professionals and businessmen left their country.

== Portuguese immigration in numbers ==
Portuguese immigration to Brazil Source: Brazilian Institute for Geography and Statistics
Period
1500–1700	1701–1760	1808–1817	1827–1829	1837–1841	1856–1857	1881–1900	1901–1930	1931–1950	1951–1960	1961–1967	1981–1991
100,000	600,000	24,000	2,004	629	16,108	316,204	754,147	148,699	235,635	54,767	4,605

== Characteristics of the immigrants ==
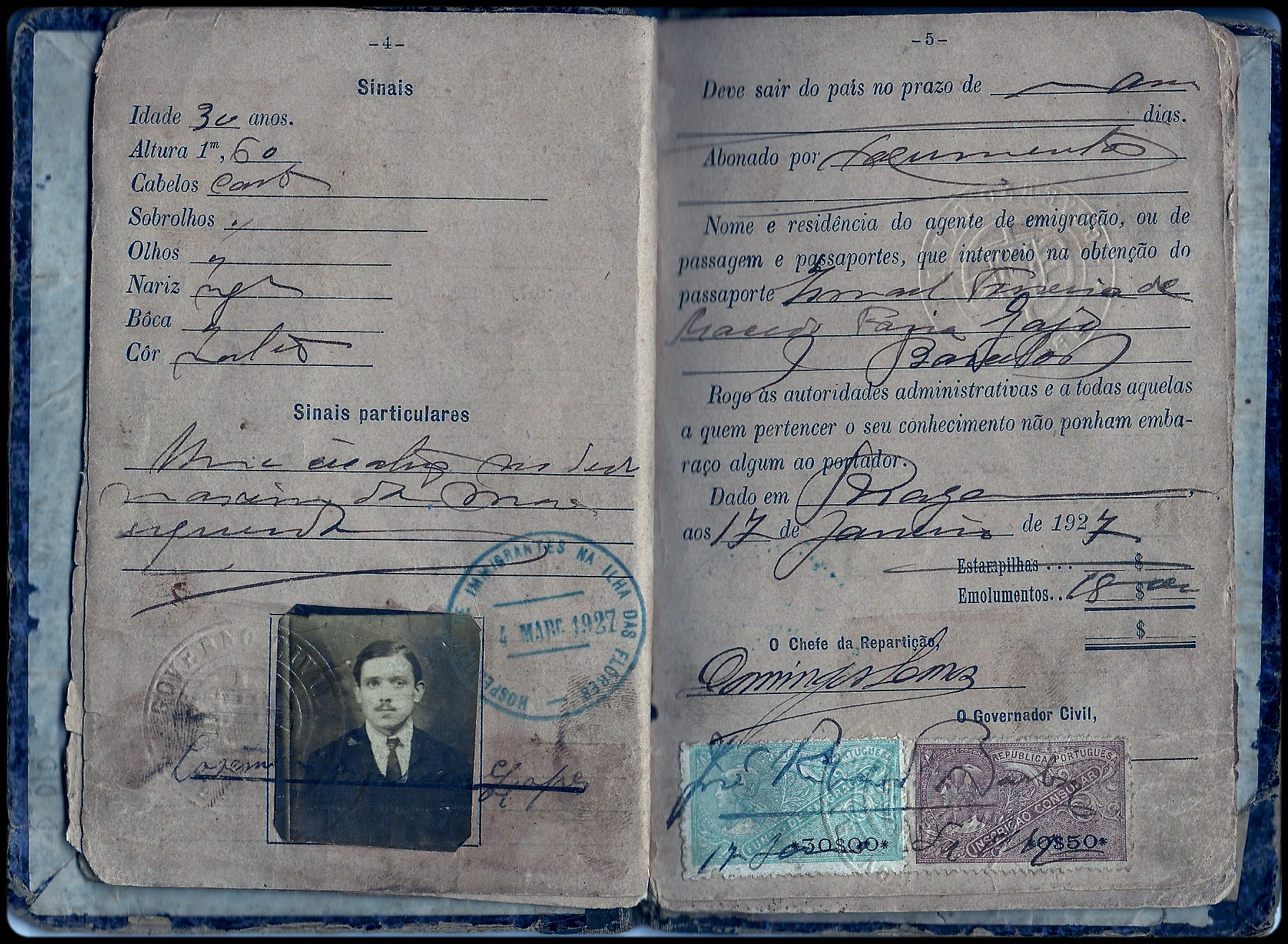
Passport of a Portuguese immigrant from the district of Braga, Portugal.

The typical Portuguese immigrant in Brazil was a single man. As an example, in the records of the community of Inhaúma, in the countryside of the state of Rio de Janeiro, from 1807 to 1841, the Portuguese-born population comprised approximately 15% of the population, of whom 90% were males. Inhaúma was not unique: this trend had lasted since the beginning of colonization. In 1872, the Consul general of Rio de Janeiro reported: (...)49,610 (Portuguese) arrivals in the past ten years by sailing ships, major, male, 35,740 and, female, 4,280; of these, 13,240 married and 22,500 unmarried; minor, 9,590, as a family, 920(...)

Although these data are not complete – they do not include those who arrived as passengers of small ships or illegally – we clearly see that females made up only 1/8 of total Portuguese immigration. In Bahia, as of 1872, the situation was even clearer: of a total of 1,498 Portuguese, only 64 were women (about 4.2%).

The disparity between the number of men and women among the Portuguese immigrants in Brazil really started to change in the early 20th century, when the largest numbers of Portuguese immigrated to Brazil. In the records of the Port of Santos, between 1908 and 1936, Portuguese female immigrants accounted for 32.1% of the Portuguese who entered Brazil, compared to less than 10% before 1872. This figure was similar to the entries of women of other nationalities, such as Italians (35.3% of women), Spaniards (40.6%) and Japanese (43.8%) and higher than the figures found among "Turks" (actually Arabs, 26.7%) and Austrians (27.3%). However, the majority still immigrated alone to Brazil (53%). Only the "Turks" (62.5%) arrived as unaccompanied immigrants in a higher percentage than the Portuguese. In comparison, only 5.1% of the Japanese immigrants arrived alone to Brazil. The Japanese kept a strong familiar connection when they immigrated to Brazil, with the largest numbers of family members, comprising 5.3 people, followed by Spaniards, with similar figures. The families of Italian origin included lower number of members, at 4.1. The Portuguese, among all immigrants, had the smallest number of people when they immigrated as families: 3.6. About 23% of the Portuguese who disembarked at the Port of Santos were under age 12. This figure shows that, for the first time in Brazil's history, large numbers of Portuguese families were settling in Brazil.

The Portuguese also had one of the highest illiteracy rates among immigrants arriving in Brazil during the early 20th century: 57.5% of them were illiterate. Only the Spaniards had a higher percentage of illiteracy: 72%. (In comparison, only 13.2% of the German immigrants to Brazil were illiterate.) The waves of Portuguese immigration to Brazil due to both the Carnation Revolution in 1974 and the European sovereign debt crisis, included large numbers of highly qualified and experienced professionals and businessmen.

Portuguese emigration at the end of the 19th century to Brazil
Region	Percentage
Beira Litoral	25%
Beira Alta	22.6%
Douro Litoral (included the city of Porto)	17%
Trás-os-Montes	14.5%
Minho	13%
Estremadura to the North of Tejo River (included the city of Lisbon)	6.3%
Baixo Tejo or the part of Estremadura to the South of Tejo River	0.6%
Beira Baixa	0.5%
Ribatejo	0.5%
Algarve	0.4%
Alto Alentejo	0.1%

== Intermarriage with other ethnic groups ==
Marriages of Portuguese immigrants in Rio de Janeiro (1907–1916)
Nationalities of the grooms and brides	Number of marriages
Portuguese man and Portuguese woman	6,964
Portuguese man and Brazilian woman	6,176
Portuguese man and Spanish woman	357
Portuguese man and Italian woman	156
Portuguese man and another foreign woman	100
Total of marriages	13,753

Records of the Portuguese immigrants to Brazil in the early 20th century reveal that they had the lowest levels of intermarriage with Brazilians among all European immigrants. Male Portuguese immigrants mainly married Portuguese female immigrants. Of the 22,030 Portuguese men and women who married in Rio de Janeiro from 1907 to 1916, 51% of men married Portuguese women. (Meanwhile, 50% of the Italian men married Italian women and only 47% of Spanish men married women from their country.) Endogamy was even higher among the female Portuguese immigrants: 84% of Portuguese women in Rio married Portuguese men, compared to 64% of Italian and 52% of Spanish women who married men from their own countries. The high level of endogamy found among the more recent Portuguese immigrants in Brazil is surprising because of many reasons. In the early 20th century, most of the Portuguese immigrants in Rio were men (a ratio of 320 men to 100 women, compared to the proportion of 266 men to 100 women among all European immigrants). The Portuguese men had fewer female compatriots with whom they could marry than the other foreign men. Despite this, more Portuguese men married compatriots than the other immigrants. Despite the cultural and linguistic similarity between Brazilians and Portuguese, the high rates of endogamy of Portuguese immigrants may be attributed to the prejudice that Brazilians had toward Portuguese immigrants, who were usually very poor. Due to this poverty, many of the criminals in Rio de Janeiro were Portuguese immigrants: of the men convicted of crimes there during the four years from 1915 to 1918, 32% were Portuguese (although Portuguese immigrants made up only 15% of the male population of Rio de Janeiro in 1920): 47% of counterfeiters, 43% of arsonists and 23% of convicted murderers were Portuguese. Exactly half of the 220 individuals convicted of manslaughter were Portuguese and 54% of the 1,024 individuals who were serving sentences in prison for assault were also from Portugal. Over time, endogamy became less frequent among Portuguese immigrants, even though they remained as the European group that least married Brazilians in Rio de Janeiro and São Paulo records. Only the Japanese immigrants had higher levels of endogamy in Brazil.

Brazilians who were born to a foreign-born father (1940 Census)
Main places of birth of the father	Number of children
Italy	1,260,931
Portugal	735,929
Spain	340,479
Germany	159,809
Syria, Lebanon, Palestine, Iraq, other Middle East	107,074
Japan-Korea	104,355

Brazilians who were born to a foreign-born mother (1940 Census)
Main places of birth of the mother	Number of female immigrants over 12 years old who had children	Number of children
Italy	130,273	1,069,862
Portugal	99,197	524,940
Spain	66,354	436,305
Japan	35,640	171,790
Germany	22,232	98,653

== Portuguese-Brazilian identity ==
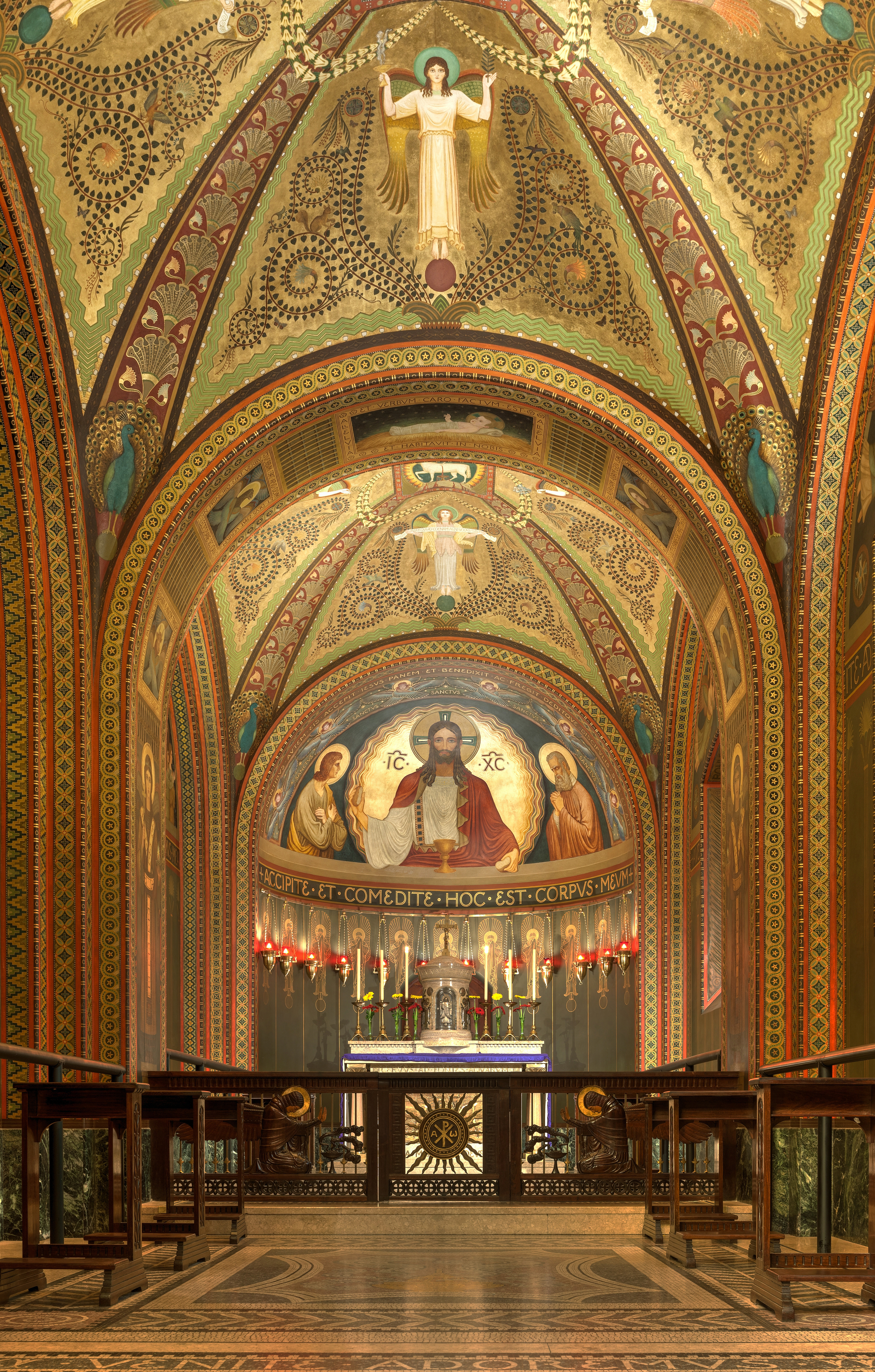
São Bento Monastery in São Paulo.

Brazil was colonized by Portugal, and both countries share Portuguese, Roman Catholicism, and many traditions.

The more recent immigrant groups of Portuguese in Brazil keep a close relation with Portugal and the Portuguese culture mainly through the Casa de Portugal. Several events also take place to maintain cultural interchange between Portuguese and Brazilian students, and between the Portugal and the Portuguese community in Brazil.

There are many Portuguese associations "Associações Portuguesas" in Brazil. Other institutions preserve the cultural heritage of the Portuguese community like the "Real Gabinete" and the Liceu Literário.

Today, news online like "Mundo Lusíada" keeps Portuguese immigrants informed about the many cultural events of the Portuguese community in Brazil. A recent analysis suggests that the more recent Portuguese immigrants (from 1900 onwards) had "low rates of intermarriage with native Brazilians and other immigrants."

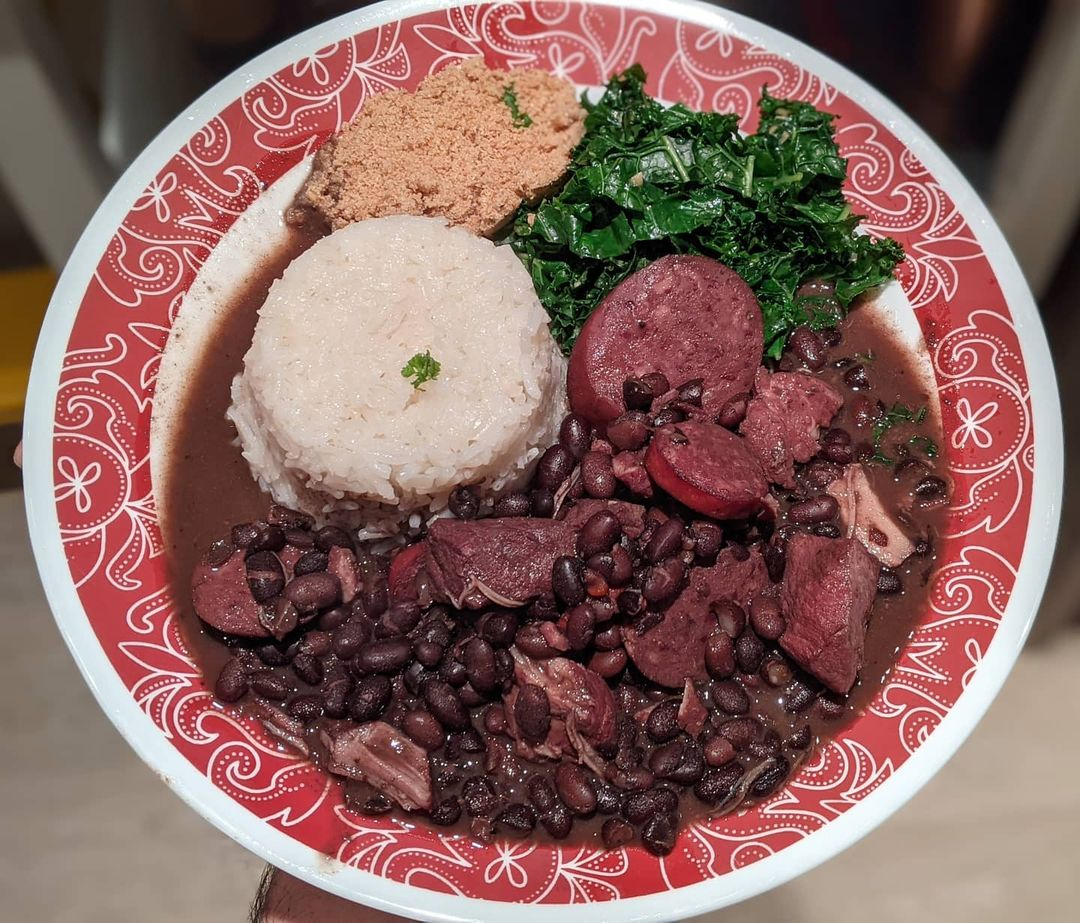
Feijoada. Considered a national dish of Brazil, is actually originated from the Portuguese cuisine.

=== Identity merge ===
The Brazilian culture is in large part derived from the Portuguese culture and the similarities between both cultures and the relatively easy integration of immigrants in Brazil, make it nearly impossible for some to keep a separate Portuguese identity.

Most common Portuguese surnames in Brazil [Forebears]
Surname	Population
Silva	5,073,774
Santos	3,981,191
Oliveira	3,738,469
Souza	2,630,114
Rodrigues	2,399,459

== The Portuguese in contemporary Brazil ==
Portuguese people are the largest immigrant community in Brazil. In the 2000 census, there were 213,203 Portuguese immigrants in Brazil.

In the late 1990s and the 2000s, some Portuguese pensioners have been moving to Brazil, mainly to the northeast, attracted by the tropical weather and the beaches.

The Portuguese crisis in 2010 and 2011 led to higher immigration of Portuguese citizens to Brazil. In the first six months of 2011, with the economic crisis in Portugal a record number of 328,826 Portuguese citizens made their situation regular in Brazil. This wave of Portuguese immigration to Brazil included large numbers of highly qualified and experienced professionals.

== Portuguese Ancestry in Brazil ==
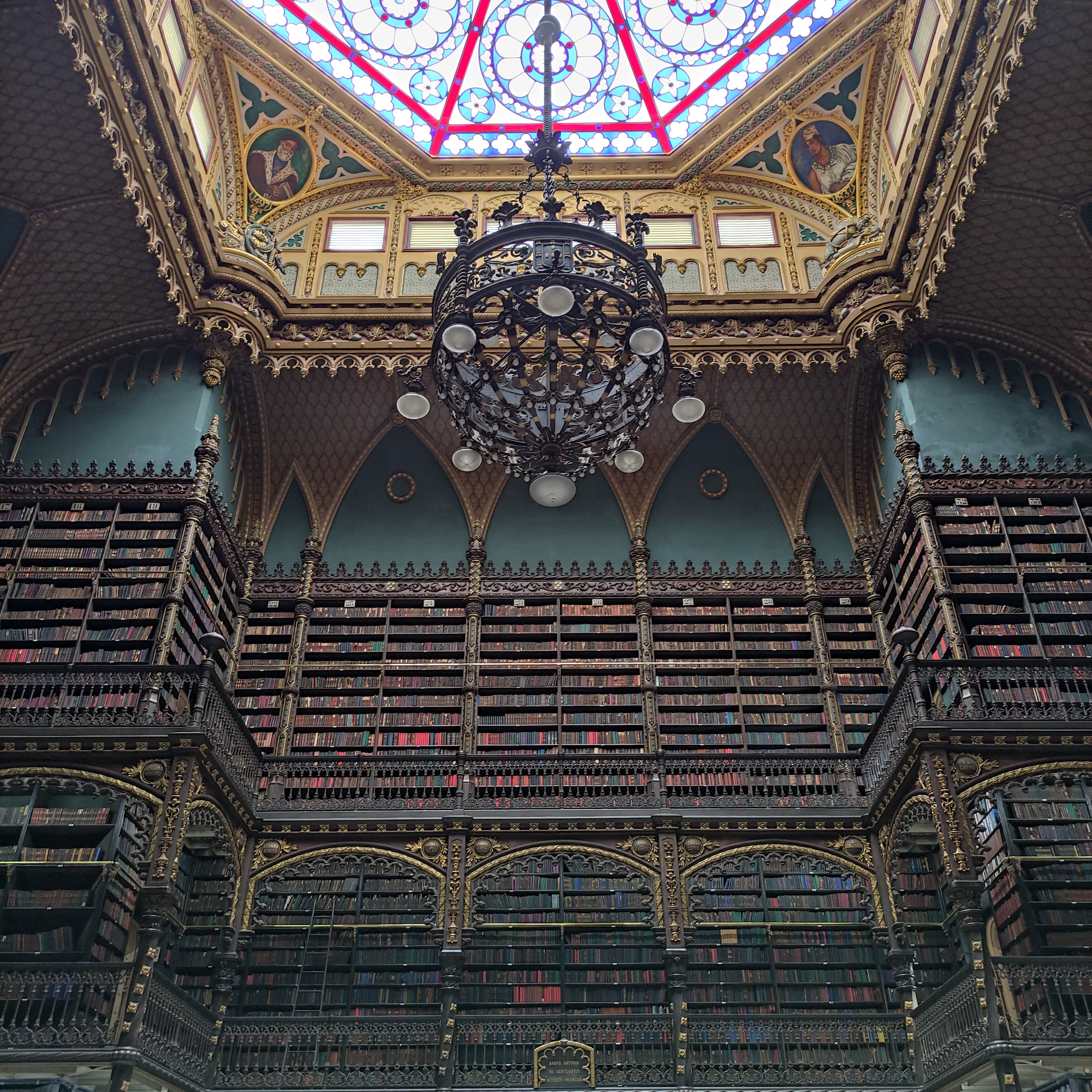
Royal Portuguese Reading Cabinet in Rio de Janeiro.

Most Brazilians have some degree of Portuguese ancestry: some descend from colonial settlers, while others have recent immigrant Portuguese origin, dating back to anywhere between the mid-19th and mid-20th centuries. Due to miscegenation, Brazilians of different ethnicities may have Portuguese ancestry: Whites, Blacks, Amerindians and people of mixed race.

There are no reliable figures for how many Brazilians descend from the Portuguese. This is mainly because the Portuguese presence in Brazil is very old, making it almost impossible to find correct numbers even though most Brazilians have Portuguese ancestry.

In 1872, there were 3.7 million Whites in Brazil (the vast majority of them of Portuguese ancestry), 4.1 million mixed-race people (mostly of Portuguese-Amerindian-African ancestry) and 1.9 million Blacks (some of whom probably had some degree of Portuguese ancestry). These numbers give the percentage of 80% of people with total or partial Portuguese ancestry in Brazil in the 1870s. At that time, the Portuguese were the only Europeans to settle Brazil in large numbers, since other groups (notably Italians) only started arriving in large numbers after 1875.

In the late 19th and early 20th centuries, a new large wave of immigrants from Portugal arrived. From 1881 to 1991, over 1.5 million Portuguese immigrated to Brazil. In 1906, for example, there were 133,393 Portuguese-born people living in Rio de Janeiro, comprising 16% of the city's population. Rio is still today considered the largest "Portuguese city" outside of Portugal itself.

Rio de Janeiro City(1890)
Group	Population	Percentage of the City
Portuguese immigrants	106,461	20,36%
Brazilians who were born to a Portuguese father or mother	161,203	30,84%
Portuguese immigrants and descendants	267,664	51,2%

Genetic studies also confirm the strong proportion of Portuguese genetic ancestry in Brazilians. According to one study, at least half of the Brazilian population's Y Chromosome comes from Portugal. Black Brazilians have an average of 48% non-African genes; most of them may have Portuguese ancestors.

== Some notable Portuguese Brazilians ==
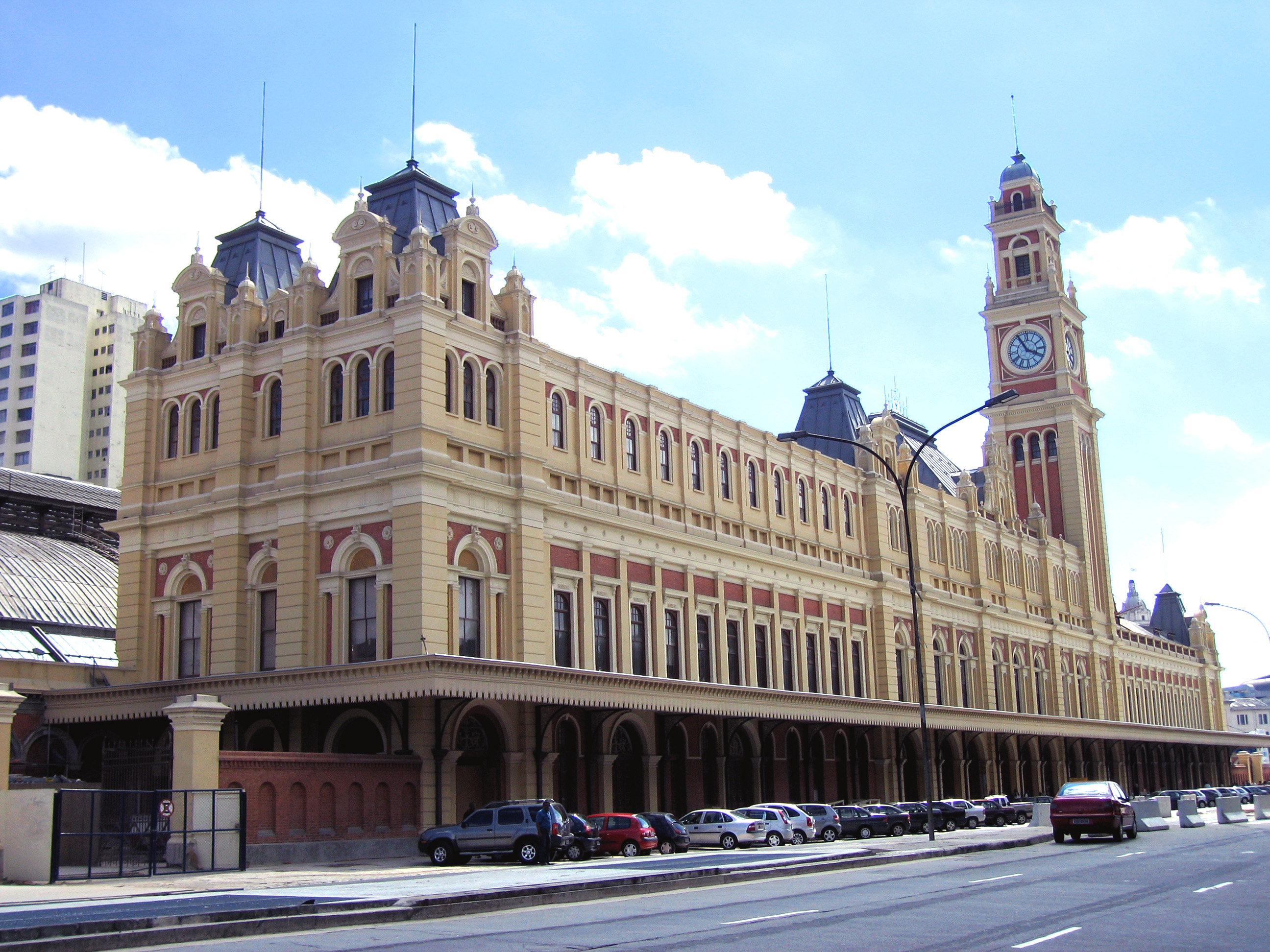
Museum of the Portuguese Language in São Paulo.

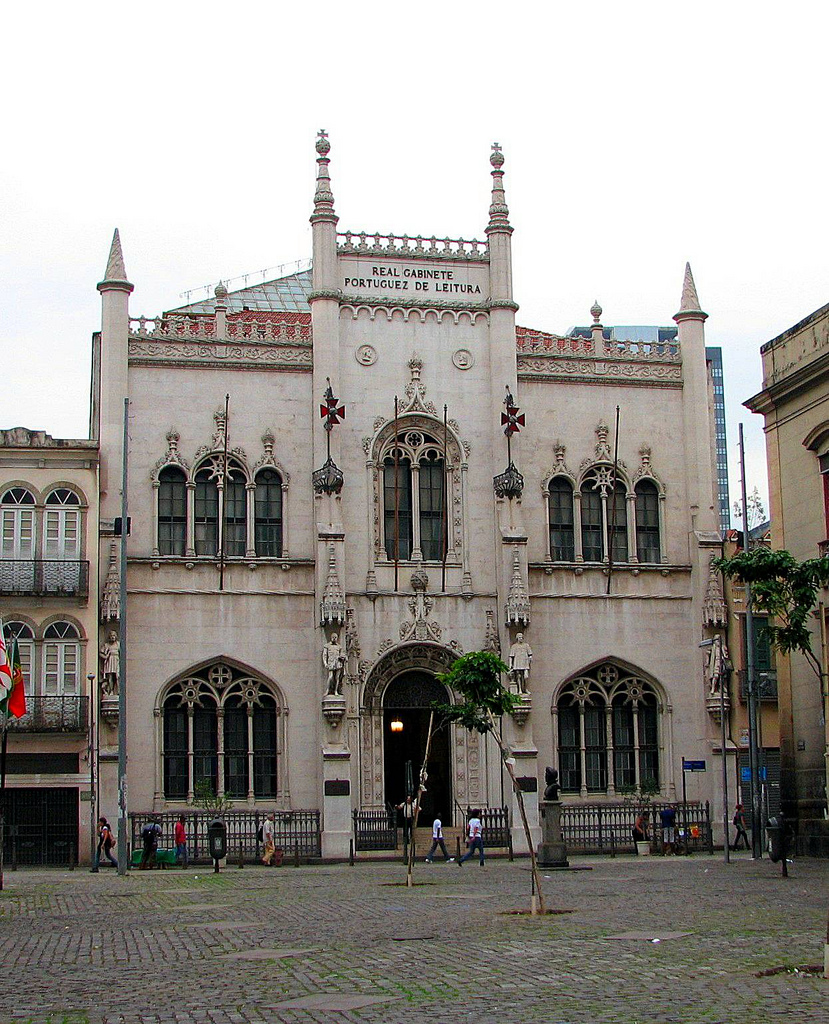
The Real Gabinete Português de Leitura (Royal Portuguese Reading Room) in Rio de Janeiro, built by Portuguese immigrants in 1837, has the largest and most valuable literary of Portuguese outside Portugal.

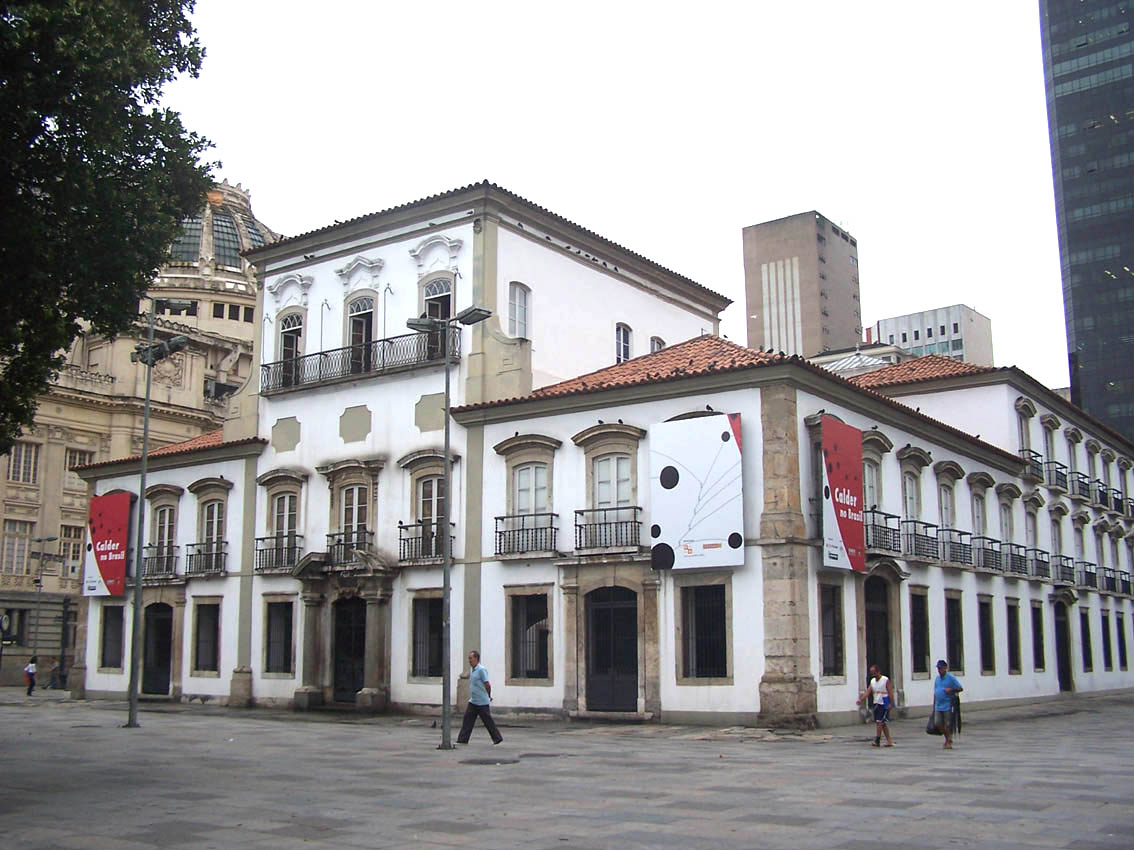
Paço Imperial, 18th-century palace that served as seat for the colonial government, King John VI of Portugal and the two Emperors of Brazil, is located in Rio de Janeiro.

Most notable Brazilians are at least partially of Portuguese descent. However, the following list is only of those who are either born in Portugal or who have close Portuguese ancestry (1st, 2nd or 3rd generation).

=== Business ===
- Abílio dos Santos Diniz (chairman and former owner of Grupo Pão de Açúcar; Portuguese parents);
- Albino Souza Cruz (founder – 1903 – and chairman – up to 1962 – of Souza Cruz, tobacco corporation);
- Antônio Ermírio de Moraes (businessman, chairman of Grupo Votorantim; Portuguese grandfather);
- Irineu Evangelista de Sousa (Barão de Mauá) (industrialist; Azorean-Portuguese grandparents)

=== Literature ===
- Aluísio Azevedo (writer; Portuguese ancestry – Brazilian-born);
- Antônio Gonçalves Dias (poet; Portuguese father);
- Padre António Vieira (writer; Portuguese-born);
- Augusto Boal (playwright and essayist; Portuguese parents);
- Basílio da Gama (poet and writer; Portuguese father);
- Casimiro de Abreu (writer; Portuguese father);
- Cecília Meireles (writer; Portuguese grandparents);
- Cláudio Manuel da Costa (writer; Portuguese father);
- Coelho Neto (writer; Portuguese father);
- Euclides da Cunha (writer; grandparents);

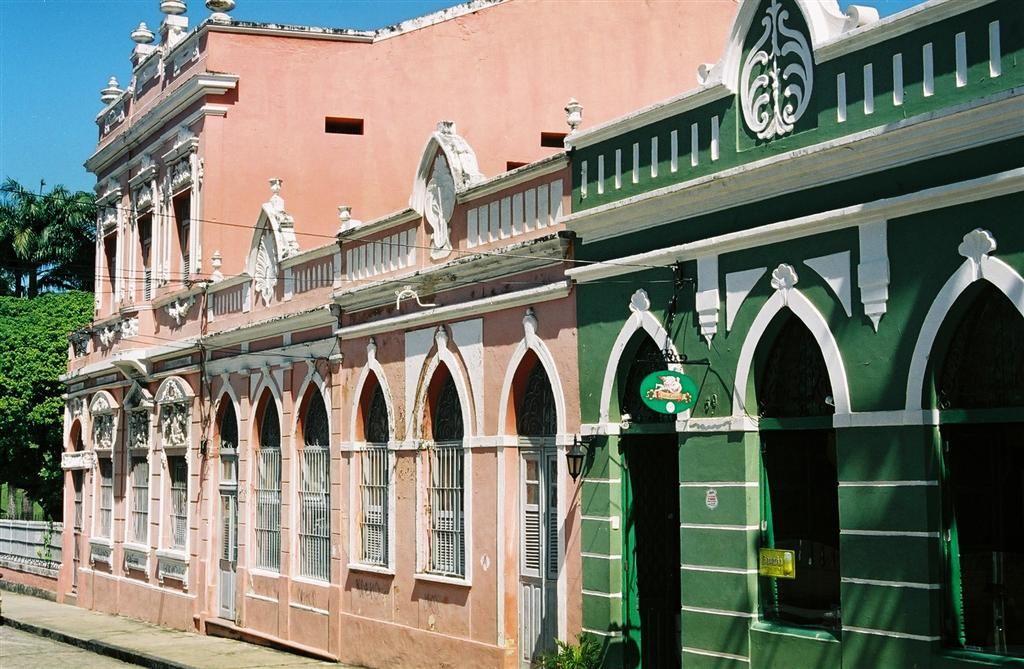
Olinda, metropolitan region of Recife, in the State of Pernambuco, founded by Portuguese.

- Gregório de Matos (colonial poet; Portuguese father);
- João Ubaldo Ribeiro (writer; Portuguese paternal grandfather);
- Machado de Assis (writer, Portuguese mother);
- Manuel Antônio de Almeida (writer; Portuguese parents);
- Rubem Fonseca (writer; Portuguese parents);
- Tomás Antônio Gonzaga (poet and involved in the Inconfidência Mineira; Portuguese-born).

=== Music ===
- Arthur Napoleão dos Santos (composer and pianist);
- César Guerra-Peixe (composer and conductor; Portuguese father);
- Marcos Portugal (colonial composer; Portuguese-born);

=== Popular music ===
- Aurora Miranda (singer; Portuguese parents);
- Carmen Miranda (singer and Hollywood actress; Portuguese-born);
- Daniela Mercury (singer; Portuguese father);
- Dóris Monteiro (singer; Portuguese parents);
- Fernanda Abreu (singer and songwriter; Portuguese father);
- Francisco de Morais Alves (singer; Portuguese parents);
- Joanna (singer and songwriter; Portuguese father);
- Nelson Gonçalves (singer; Portuguese parents);
- Roberto Leal (singer; Portuguese-born).

=== Entertainment ===
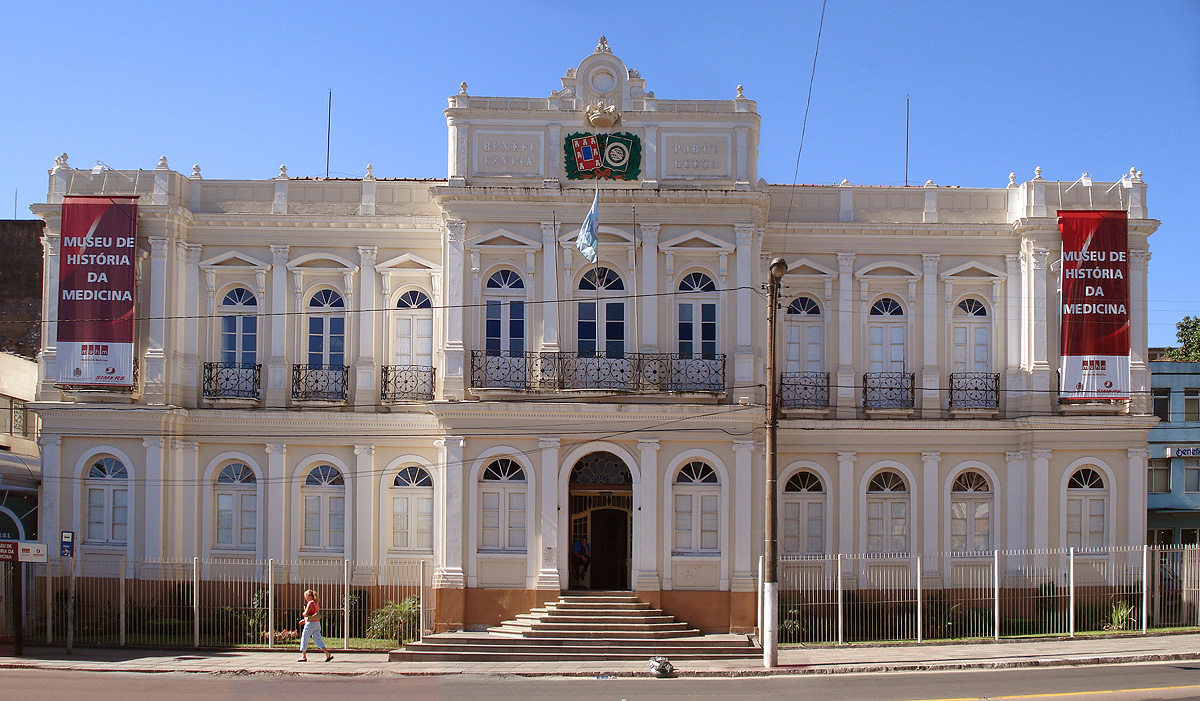
Portuguese Hospital in the city of Porto Alegre, State of Rio Grande do Sul.

- Amácio Mazzaropi (actor and film-maker; Portuguese mother);
- Eugênia Câmara (actress; Portuguese-born);
- Fernanda Montenegro (Oscar-nominated actress; Portuguese grandparents);
- Marília Pêra (actress; Portuguese father);
- Ruy Guerra (director; Portuguese-born);
- Thiago Lacerda (actor; Portuguese grandparents);

=== Sports ===
- Antony (footballer)
- Zico (former footballer; Portuguese parents);
- Glover Teixeira (former mixed martial arts fighter and UFC light heavyweight champion);

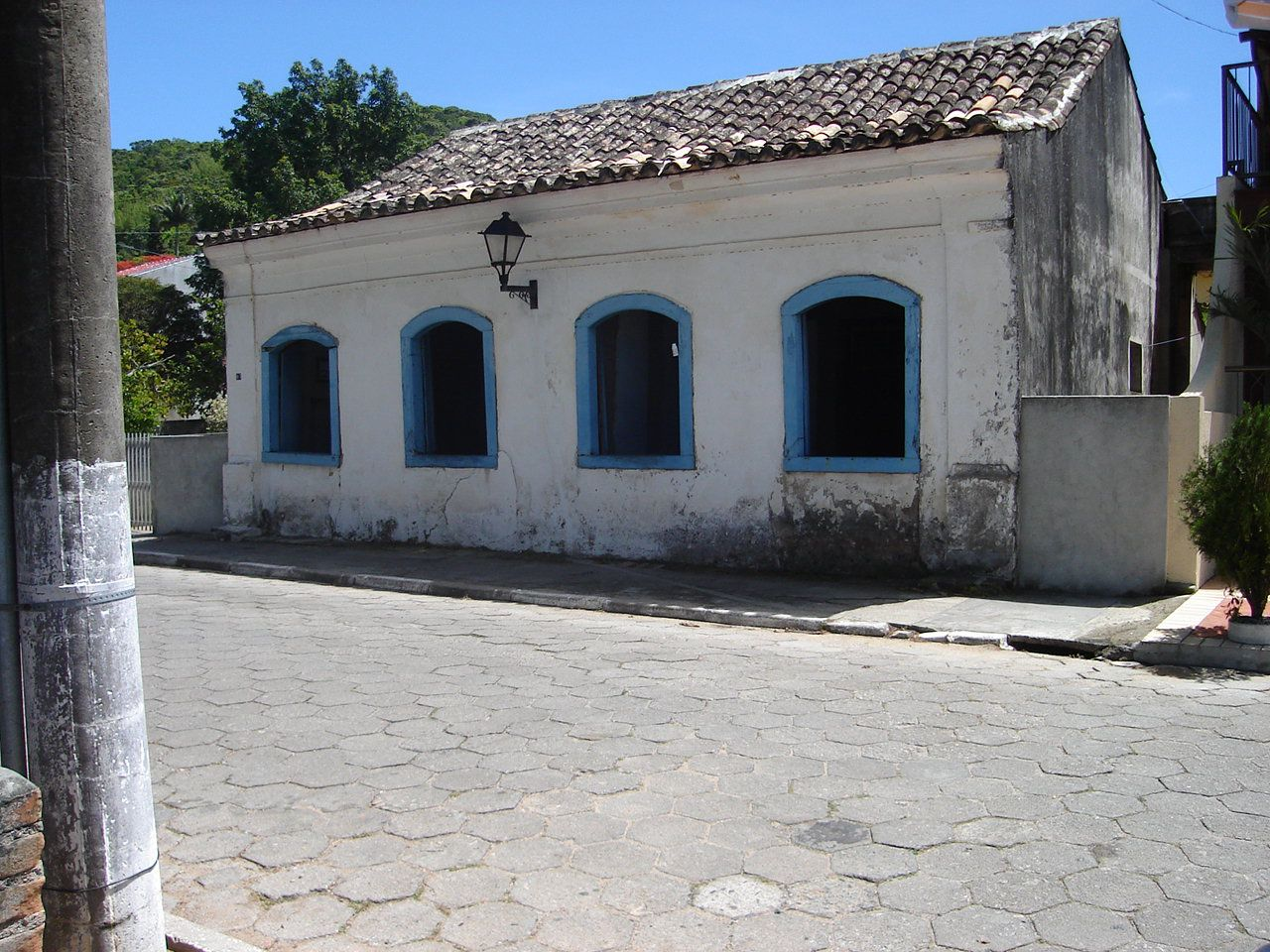
Azorean Portuguese house in the city of Florianópolis, State of Santa Catarina.

=== Fine arts ===
- Antônio Francisco Lisboa (Aleijadinho) (colonial sculptor and architect; Portuguese father);
- Artur Barrio (sculptor and artist; Portuguese-born);
- Joaquim Tenreiro (plastic artist and furniture designer, Portuguese-born);
- Manoel da Costa Ataíde (colonial painter; Portuguese parents);
- Victor Meirelles (painter; Azorean-Portuguese parents).

=== Government and politics ===
- Afonso Pena – 6th President of Brazil
- Antônio Carlos Magalhães – 37th, 39th, and 43rd Governor of Bahia
- Artur da Costa e Silva – 27th President of Brazil
- Delfim Moreira – 10th President of Brazil
- Dom Pedro I – 1st Emperor of Brazil
- Dom Pedro II – 2nd Emperor of Brazil
- Fernando Henrique Cardoso – 34th President of Brazil
- Rodrigues Alves – 5th President of Brazil
- Artur Bernardes – 11th President of Brazil
- Washington Luís – 12th President of Brazil
- Getúlio Vargas – 14th, and 17th President of Brazil
- José Gomes Temporão – 41st Minister of Health of Brazil
- João Goulart – 24th President of Brazil
- Mário Covas – 30th Governor of São Paulo
- Luiz Inácio Lula da Silva – 35th and 39th president of Brazil

== See also ==
- Brazil–Portugal relations
- Portuguese people
- Portuguese diaspora
- Brazilians in Portugal
- Geographic distribution of Portuguese
- Demographics of Brazil
- White Brazilians
- White Latin American
- Brazilian people
- Mixed-race Brazilian
