= Rebelo Gonçalves =

Portuguese philologist

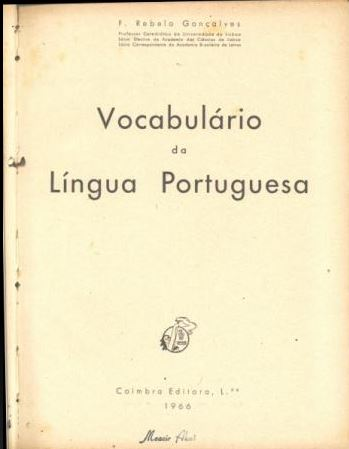
Title page of the first edition of Vocabulário da Língua Portuguesa. Coimbra, 1966.

Francisco da Luz Rebelo Gonçalves (November 15, 1907 – April 23, 1982) was a Portuguese philologist, lexicographer, and professor. He authored the Tratado de Ortografia da Língua Portuguesa (1947) and the Vocabulário da Língua Portuguesa (1966), works that influenced the Portuguese-Language Orthographic Agreement of 1990.

== Biography ==
Born in Santarém, Gonçalves studied classical philology at the University of Lisbon, from which he later obtained his doctoral degree. He taught at the Faculty of Letters of the University of Coimbra and the Faculty of Letters of the University of Lisbon before moving to Brazil in 1934. There, he assumed the chair of Portuguese philology at the newly established Faculty of Philosophy, Science and Letters of the University of São Paulo, where he also taught Greek and Latin philology. Around this period, he wrote essays on Portuguese literature, especially Camões.

He was among the founders of the Casa de Portugal in São Paulo, which he presided. In 1940, he was awarded the Order of the Southern Cross. Gonçalves served as one of the rapporteurs of the Portuguese delegation at the 1945 Luso-Brazilian Orthographic Conference, which produced the Portuguese-Language Orthographic Agreement of 1945.
