= Casa de Portugal in São Paulo =

Portuguese immigrant association in São Paulo, Brazil

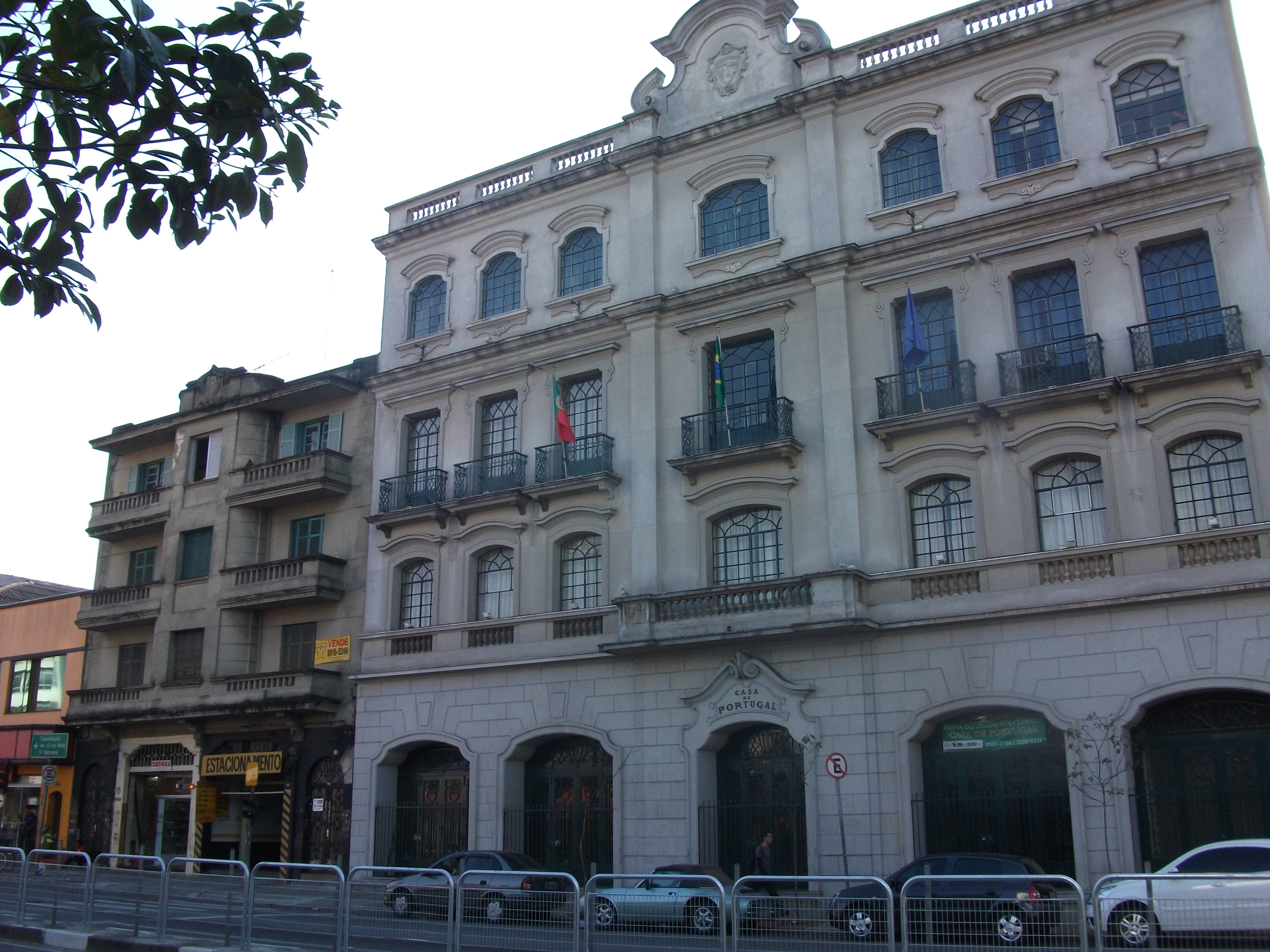
- Exterior of Casa de Portugal building in São Paulo
- Founded at: São Paulo
- Website: casadeportugalsp.com.br

The Casa de Portugal is an association of Portuguese immigrants in São Paulo created in 1935.

== History ==
The Casa de Portugal was founded on 13 July 1935 with the aim of representing all Portuguese immigrants and their descendants in São Paulo. There were many Portuguese associations in the city, representing immigrants from specific regions of Portugal, and the original idea of the founders was to bring these organizations under one roof. The foundation of the Casa de Portugal saw representatives of União Transmontana, Casa do Minho, União Portuguesa, Centro Beirão and Centro do Douro. Other organizations were subsequently invited, but preferred to maintain their regional character and refused. The first president was the philologist Rebelo Gonçalves, a professor at the newly founded University of São Paulo, but he remained in office for only 10 months and was succeeded for the interim by Aurélio Martins Arrobas and in 1936 by Fernando Ribeiro Bacellar.

Initially the Casa de Portugal worked at the headquarters of the Casa do Minho and then in rented properties. Through donations from members and bank loans land and buildings were purchased on the Avenida da Liberdade, in the city center in 1943. The inauguration of the headquarters took place on December 27, 1955.

== Features ==
The headquarters of the Casa de Portugal is a neocolonial building of five floors designed by Portuguese architect Ricardo Severo. The lobby is decorated with paintings depicting Afonso I, the first king of Portugal, and Manuel da Nobrega, a Portuguese Jesuit priest very influential in the early History of Brazil, and who participated in the founding of several cities, such as Recife, Salvador, Rio de Janeiro and São Paulo, and many Jesuit Colleges and seminaries. The building also has meeting rooms, a restaurant, theater, gallery exhibition and a ballroom with a capacity for 1,000 people.

The Casa de Portugal also serves as headquarters for the Council of the Luso-Brazilian Community of São Paulo, the Portuguese Chamber of Commerce and the Ombudsman of the Portuguese Community. It was also headquarters for the Consulate of Portugal in São Paulo and the Camões Institute, but these institutions have moved to a building in the Jardim América area in 2004.

=== Library ===
The creation of a library for the Casa de Portugal had been planned since its foundation, when the partners began to donate books to the collection. In 1957 the library was opened, and in 1991 it was extended with an auditorium and reading room. Currently it has 12,000 volumes, of which almost half are dedicated to history and Luso-Brazilian literature.
