= Albino Souza Cruz =

Brazilian businessman

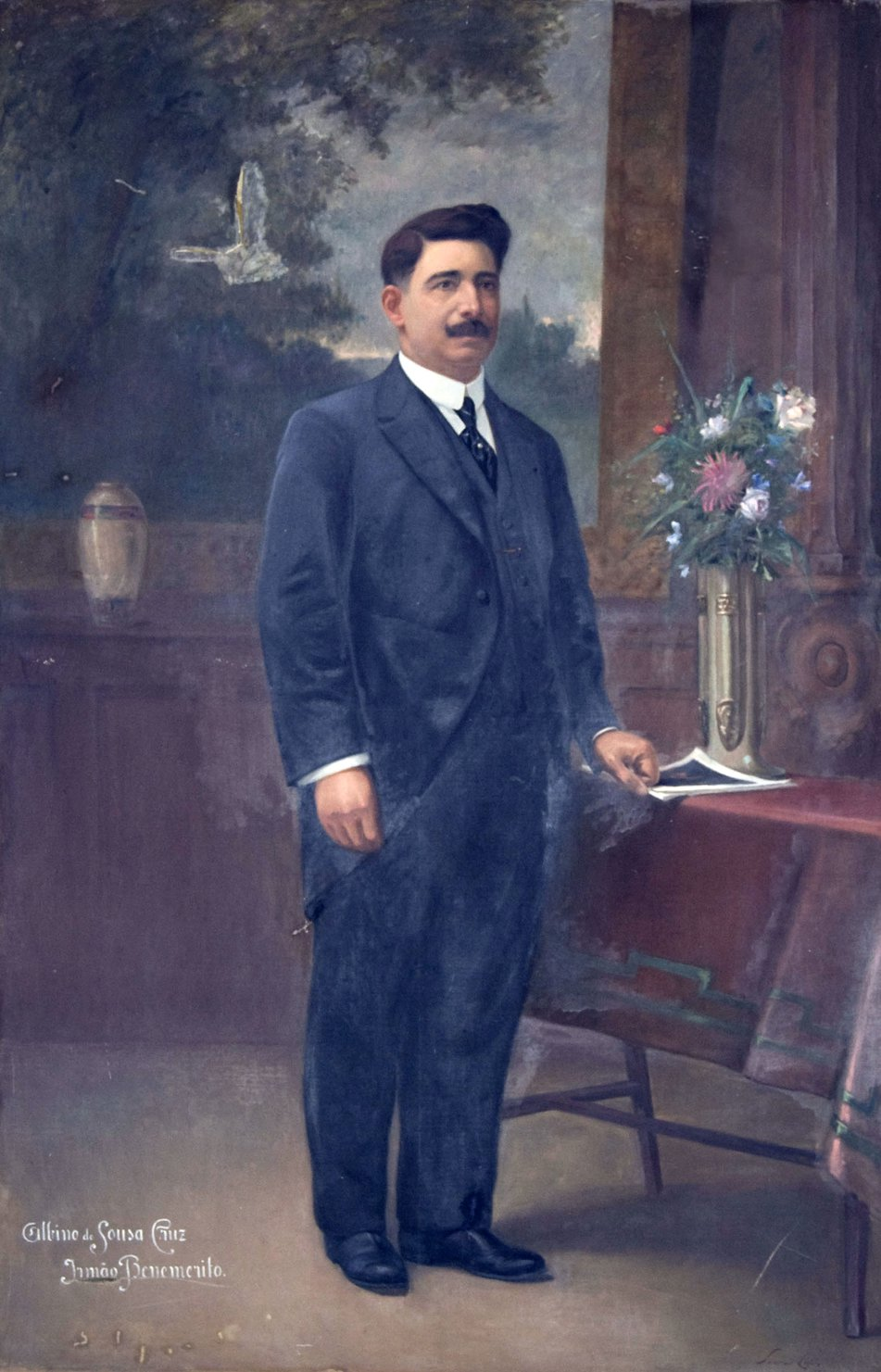
Image of Albino Sousa Cruz

Albino Sousa Cruz (1869 in Santa Eulália da Palmeira, Santo Tirso – 1962 in Rio de Janeiro) was a Portuguese-Brazilian businessman, founder of Souza Cruz, later (and to this day) the subsidiary of British American Tobacco in Brazil.

Born in a small hinterland village in Portugal, he emigrated on November 15, 1885, landing in Rio de Janeiro. There he worked for 18 years in a tobacco factory, Fábrica de Fumos Veado. At age 33, having saved some earnings and acquired a solid knowledge of the trade, he established a small manufacture of paper wrapped cigarettes, which were then a novelty. Production soon reached industrial scale, and Souza Cruz became the CEO of Brazil's biggest tobacco company.

Souza Cruz's cigarettes were often branded in feminine names, such as Yolanda, Dalila, Rosita or Marly, and their ads featured sensual women (for instance, Yolanda Alencar, who featured the ads for the cigarettes branded after her). Other innovative marketing techniques were used, such as vouchers included in the packs that could be exchanged by prizes.

He retired in 1962 and died in 1966. At the time of his death the first controversies about the health issues related to tobacco were spreading; he was not a smoker.
