= International identifier =

An international identifier is a number of different size which comes above or beside the national identification number and helps to identify a company over several countries in the world.

== See also ==
- DUNS NUMBER
- EasyNumber
- European Business Register Network
- ISO 9362 (Business Identifier Code)
- Legal Entity Identifier
- Unified Business Identifier (UBI)
- Unique Entity Identifier
