= EasyNumber =

EasyNumber (acronym reading "Enterprise Access SYstem Number") is a Business information identifier provided by the Easynumber Company, a joint venture between the Companies Creditreform and Coface. It is sequentially allocated to any type of private or public organization, operating business or services providers, domestically or internationally, regardless the country of origin or the operating industry.

This international identifier, based on an open approach, matches with multiple National identification number's sources.

== Structure ==
It's a tool designed to facilitate the functional conduct of business. This identifier comes in addition with the existing local identifiers, with which it is synchronized.

Practically, it is a 19-digit number based on the following structure:

- the first 14 digits make the Company EasyNumber: 12 incremental digits + 2 control key digits
- the last 5 digits identify the establishment of the company.

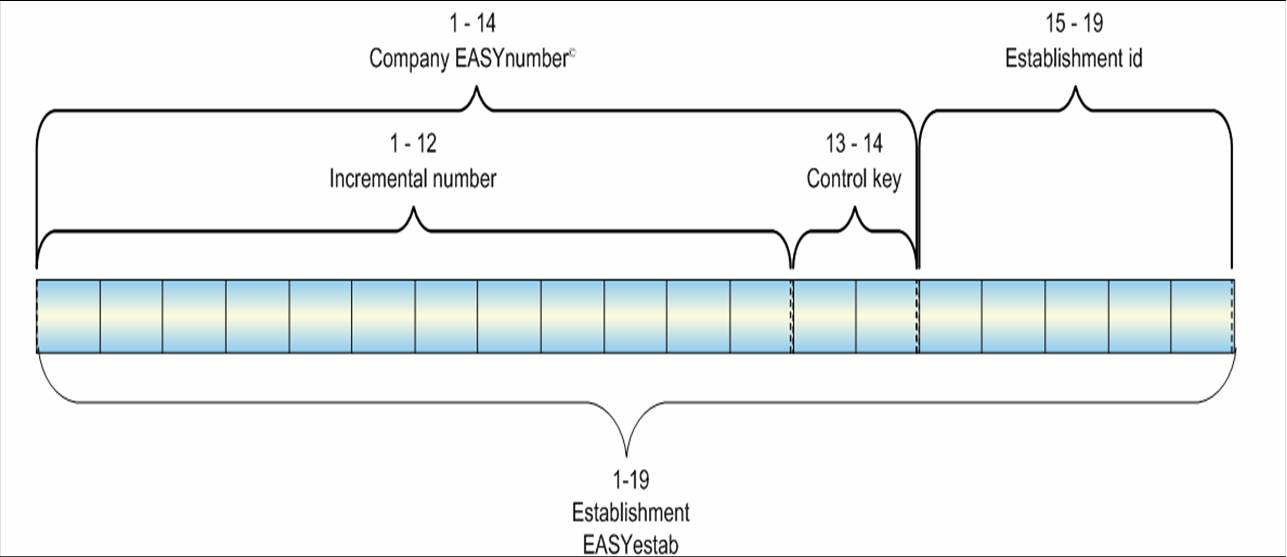

== Acknowledgment ==
Launched in June 2007, Easynumber is acknowledged by the BIAA, the FECMA, and meets the expectations of the European Commission (CEN Workshop Agreement November 2009). As of February 2017, 80 million companies were granted an Easynumber
