= Variable symbol =

Payment identifier

Variable symbol (Czech: Variabilní symbol) is an identifier widely used for domestic payments in Slovakia and Czech Republic. Its maximum length is 10 characters and consists only of digits.

== History ==
Putting a variable symbol in the payment order was modified by Decree CNB 62/2004 Coll. (Repealed Decree of the Czech National Bank No. 169/2011 Coll. without compensation, despite the repealed ordinance is still in practice).

== Standards ==
From an accounting point of view there are no limits for its use in business. A few de facto standards govern its use:

- Variable symbols are usually used to indicate invoice numbers (after omitting any nonnumerical characters).
- The National identification number is used to identify individuals, without a separating slash (especially for payments to local authorities, housing associations, etc.).
- For identification of legal entities, IČO is used (for payments to the tax office, etc.).

Usage of variable symbol is widespread and is often required by companies as well as by local, tax and other authorities. For international payments, the Czech National Bank and Czech Banking Association recommend that the variable symbol appear in the text for the receiver in the format: /VS/nnnnnnnnnn where n is a digit in the variable symbol.
