= Tembhli =

Village in Maharashtra

Coordinates: 21°34′N 74°30′E

- Village
- Interactive map of Tembhli
- Country: India
- State: Maharashtra

Tembhli is a village in Nandurbar district of Maharashtra state in India, where the Unique Identification Authority of India launched the Aadhaar program on 29 September 2010 and the first person was given an Aadhaar identity number.
