= CPR-kontoret =

Danish government agency

CPR-kontoret (English: CPR-Office) is the Danish government agency that houses Det Centrale Personregister. It was established in 1968. Among other things, it is responsible for ensuring that every person registered as a citizen of Denmark receives a personal identification number. The office is a department of the Ministry for Digital Affairs.
