= Civic booklet and enrolment booklet (Argentina) =

Identity document of Argentina

The Civic Booklet (Spanish: Libreta Cívica, LC) and the Enlistment booklet (Spanish: Libreta de Enrolamiento, LE) served as the basic identification document issued to Argentine nationals from the age of 18 onwards, with place of residence or permanent residence in the territory of Argentina during the Juan Perón era. Since 1 April 2017, except for people over 75, these documents have lost validity.

== Introduction of the identity card ==
The introduction of identity cards was a progression in the effort to modernize population records. The "Libreta de Enrolamiento" (Enlistment booklet), introduced under Law 8129 of July 4, 1911, required all male citizens to register at the age of 18. These records, based on military service enlistment per Law 4031 of December 1901, were also integral to creating electoral rolls. These rolls facilitated the implementation of the Sáenz Peña Law of 1912, which established secret and mandatory voting for men, advancing Argentina's democratic processes.

In order to get more "gender equility", Libreta Cívica (Civic booklet) was introduced. Following the passage of a law in 1947 under Juan D. Perón's administration, women were granted the right to vote. However, unlike men, women were not subject to military service, necessitating the creation of a separate female electoral roll.

This undertaking required nearly four years of work. A nationwide census was conducted, with visiting households daily from 8:00 AM to 8:00 PM. Simultaneously, an extensive public campaign encouraged women to register. As a result, women participated in their first presidential election on November 11, 1951.

== Replacement by the DNI ==
In 1968 the old "green case" DNI has been instituted in the Argentine dictatorship. At the beginning they were printed by Siemens AG (which later had a bribery scandal).

== Gallery ==
Cover of the Civic Book

Cover of the Enlistment Book

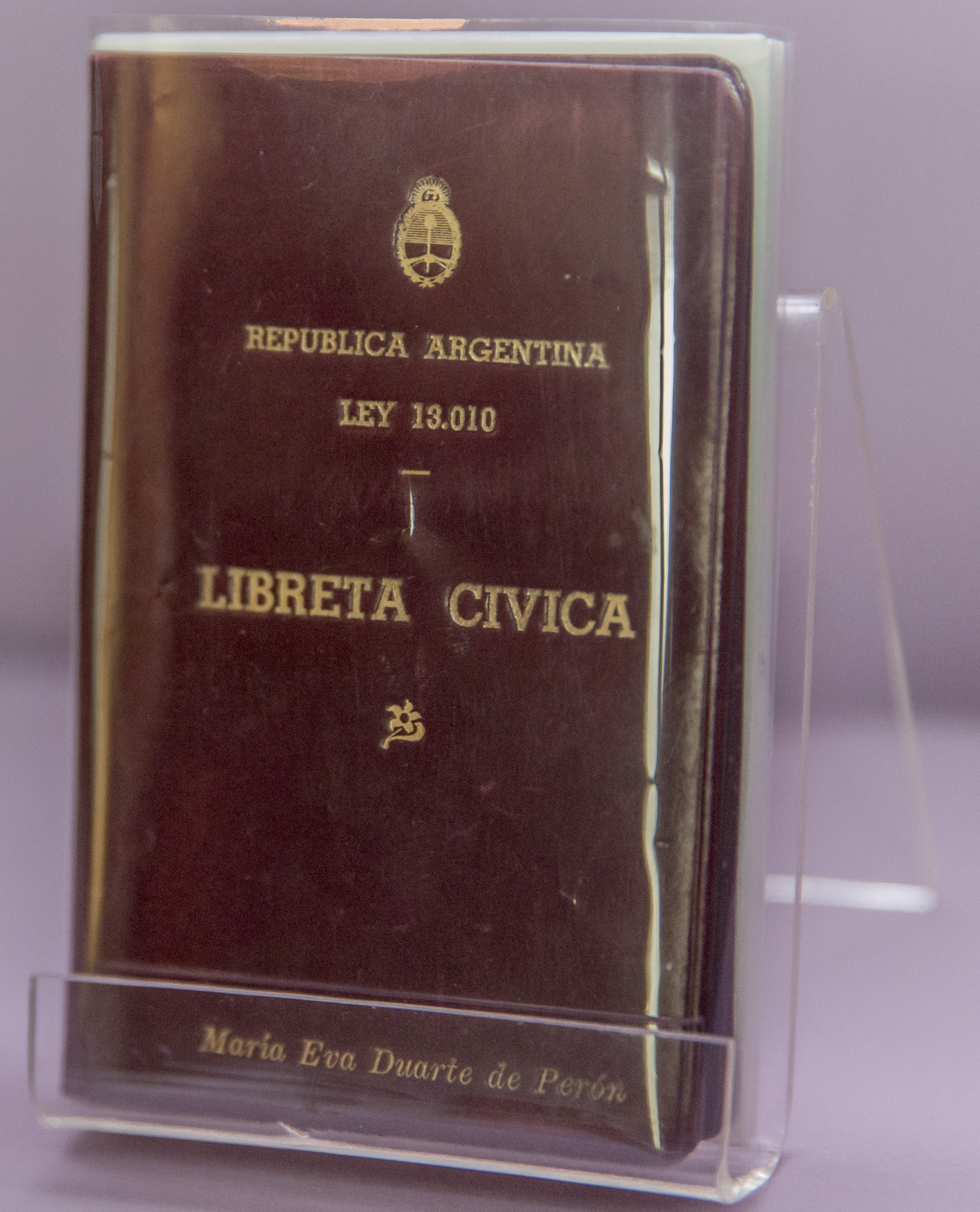
Eva Perón's Civic Book at Museo Perón

Propaganda showing the Civic Book

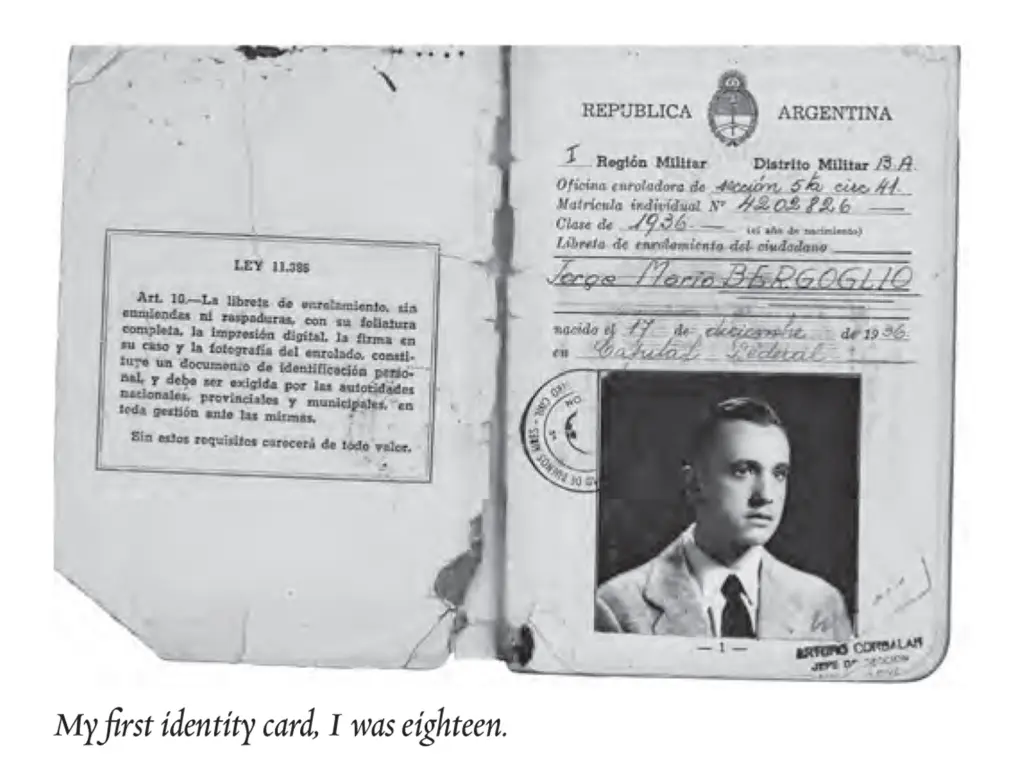
First Enlistment Book of Pope Francis that receiven when turned eighteen
