= MITx =

MOOC program at MIT

MITx is the massive open online course (MOOC) program at Massachusetts Institute of Technology. A constituent program of MIT's Office of Digital Learning, MITx produces MOOCs from MIT departments and faculty. Prior to 2U's acquisition of edX, MITx courses appeared on edX. After the acquisition, courses appeared on MIT's own site. MITx also supports residential experiments with scalable learning technologies and research on digital learning. MOOCs offered through edX by MITx are open-enrollment and free to take. In September 2012, edX and MITx introduced the option to receive an ID verified certificate on some courses.

== History ==
The MITx program was announced on December 19, 2011, and originally included three components: 1) development and offering of massive open online courses, 2) research on the effectiveness of emerging digital learning tools, and 3) the development of an open source platform for offering massive open online courses. Initial course and platform development for MITx was undertaken under the direction of Professor Anant Agarwal in the MIT Computer Science and Artificial Intelligence Lab (CSAIL).

On May 3, 2012, the open platform component was spun off into edX, a non-profit co-owned by MIT and Harvard and charged with platform development and the creation of a consortium of leading institutions offering MOOCs. Professor Agarwal was named the first president of edX.

On November 20, 2012, the MITx program was placed organizationally within the newly created MIT Office of Digital Learning, which would also eventually include three other MIT organizations: MIT OpenCourseWare, the Office of Educational Innovation and Technology, and Academic Media Production Services. Materials Science professor Sanjay Sarma was named MIT's Director of Digital Learning and Computer Science professor Isaac Chuang was named associate director of Digital Learning.

== Courses and programs offered ==
=== X-Series ===
MITx has one of the largest offerings of MOOCs through the edX platform. On September 17, 2013, MITx announced the first of its XSeries Certificate programs, which offer recognition for the completion of a series of related MOOC courses. Current XSeries include Supply Chain Management, Education Technology, Development Policy, and Aerodynamics.

=== MicroMasters ===
In 2016, MITx launched a new Micromasters credential in Supply Chain Management. The MicroMasters in Supply Chain from MIT is an advanced, professional, graduate-level foundation in Supply Chain Management. It represents the equivalent of 1 semester's worth of coursework at MIT. To earn a Micromaster's credential, learners must complete a sequence of 5 MOOCs, followed by a comprehensive capstone exam.
