= Alewife =

Alewife may refer to:

== Places in Massachusetts, United States ==
- Alewife station, in Cambridge
- Alewife Brook Reservation, a state park spanning Cambridge, Arlington, and Somerville
- Alewife Brook Parkway, a road in Cambridge
- Alewife Linear Park, in Cambridge and Somerville

== Other ==
- Alewife (fish), a North American herring
- Alewife (trade), a female brewer
- "Alewife", a song from the Clairo album Immunity
- Alewife (multiprocessor), a computer system

== See also ==
- Dead Alewives, an improvisational comedy troupe
