= Kevin Ashton =

British technology pioneer

- Ashton at the 2026 South by Southwest Festival.
- Born: 1968 (age 57–58); Birmingham, England
- Children: Arlo Ashton; Sasha Ashton; Theo Ashton

Kevin Ashton (born 1968) is a British technology pioneer who cofounded the Auto-ID Center at the Massachusetts Institute of Technology (MIT), which created a global standard system for RFID and other sensors. He is known for coining the term "the Internet of Things" to describe a system where the Internet is connected to the physical world via ubiquitous sensors.

== Biography ==
Ashton was born in Birmingham, UK. He read Scandinavian Studies at University College London from 1990 to 1994. He was working as an assistant brand manager at Procter & Gamble (P&G) in 1997 when he became interested in using RFID to help manage P&G's supply chain. This work led him to MIT, where he helped start an RFID research consortium called the Auto-ID Center with professors Sanjay Sarma and Sunny Siu and researcher David Brock. The center opened in 1999 as an industry-sponsored research project with the goal of creating a global open standard system to put RFID everywhere. Ashton was the Center's Executive Director. Siu, then Sarma, acted as Research Director, later Chairman of Research. Under Ashton and Sarma's leadership, the number of sponsors grew to 103, and additional labs were funded at other major universities around the world. Once the system was developed, MIT licensed it to not-for-profit standards body GS1 and the project reached a successful conclusion. The labs were renamed Auto-ID Labs and continue their research.

Ashton became a high-tech entrepreneur with start-ups ThingMagic, cleantech company EnerNOC (NASDAQ:ENOC) and Zensi, an energy-sensing company he founded with Shwetak Patel among others. Zensi was acquired by Belkin International in April 2010. Ashton then developed and launched the Belkin Wemo (originally stylized as WeMo) home automation system. He writes for RFID Journal, Medium and Quartz, and published a book, How to Fly a Horse with Random House in 2015. In January 2016, How to Fly a Horse won "Best Business Book" from 1-800-CEO-READ.

For an April 2013 Quartz article Ashton created Santiago Swallow, a fictional Mexican social media guru who specializes in the "imagined self", the fictional expert was furnished with 90,000 paid-for Twitter followers and a Wikipedia biography. The creation of Swallow is an attempt to show that credibility is unrelated to the quantity of Twitter followers.

== Scientific publications ==
Kevin Ashton's scientific publications can be found in leading science and media journals:

- The Atlantic;
- New York Times;
- RFID Journal;
- Medium;
- Quartz.
