= MITX =

MITX may refer to:

- Mini-ITX, a low-power motherboard form factor developed by VIA Technologies
- MITx, a massive open online course program by Massachusetts Institute of Technology
- Microtexture, a kind of road texture
