= ATRenew =

Chinese circular economy

- Native name: 万物新⽣
- Formerly: AiHuiShou
- Type: Public
- Traded as: NYSE: RERE
- Industry: Recycling; Recommerce
- Founded: 2011
- Founder: Kerry Xuefeng Chen
- Headquarters: Shanghai, China
- Area served: Worldwide
- Revenue: ▲CN¥13.0 billion (2023)
- Number of employees: 2,000+ (2024)
- Website: atrenew.com

ATRenew (formerly AiHuiShou) is a Chinese company established in 2011 and headquartered in Shanghai, founded by Kerry Xuefeng Chen. ATRenew operates two main business segments: a second-hand product trade and service system, and an urban green industry chain business. The company has several subsidiaries, including AHS Recycle, and maintains a strategic partnership with JD.com, which was its largest investor prior to ATRenew's rebranding. ATRenew is traded on the NYSE.

== History ==
The company launched in 2011 as ATRenew as a recycling service for mobile phones. Over time, it expanded its focus to include a broader range of consumer electronics, gradually increasing its physical and online presence across China. In 2015, AiHuiShou began collaborating on trade-in programs with JD.com and Xiaomi.

In 2017, AiHuiShou started automating its operational systems and established an operation center in Changzhou. In 2018, AiHuiShou launched a B2B trading platform for pre-owned consumer electronics.

In June 2019, AiHuiShou integrated JD.com's Paipai Marketplace, enabling AiHuiShou to manage JD.com's second-hand, idle, inventory, and resale businesses within the 3C (computer, communication, and consumer electronics) categories. On September 22, 2020, AiHuiShou rebranded to ATRenew (All Things Renew) and launched AHS Recycle, offering recycling services through chain stores, self-service kiosks, and online platforms.

On June 18, 2021, ATRenew went public on the NYSE. In 2022, ATRenew's largest and most automated facility, the Dongguan Automation Operation Center, began operating. By the end of 2022, ATRenew had established eight major regional operation centers, located in Dongguan, Changzhou, Wuhan, Chengdu, Tianjin, Xi'an, Shenyang, and Hong Kong. In the second quarter of 2022, ATRenew launched its "multi-category" strategy, expanding its recycling services to include photographic equipment, bags, watches, gold, prestige liquors, shoes, and other items through its physical stores.

In June 2023, ATRenew began collaborating with Apple Inc. for its recycling and trade-in services available on Apple's official website and in offline flagship stores across China. In the same year, ATRenew joined the United Nations Global Compact (UNGC).

== Funding ==
The company had a financing round in 2018 securing $150 million in investment led by Tiger Global Management and JD.com valuing the company at over $1.5 billion. By February 2021, the company raised $200 million in pre-IPO fundraising. On 22 September 2022, after rebranding, the company announced that it had raised over $100 million in E+ round of financing with JD.com – its biggest investor which acquired 34% of ordinary shares before offering. Other investors included Huihe Capital, InnoVen Capital and Shanghai Prosperity Fund with Taihe Capital serving as its exclusive financial adviser for the E+ round of funding.

== Business lines ==
ATRenew operates several business lines, including AHS Recycle, PJT Marketplace, Paipai Marketplace, AHS Device, and LOVERE (AiFenLei).

AHS Recycle is a C2B recycling and trade-in platform offering recycling services to consumers and collaborating with partners like JD.com and Apple for trade-in services. As of the end of 2023, AHS Recycle has expanded across 268 cities in China through a network of 1,819 offline AHS stores.

PJT Marketplace serves as a B2B platform where businesses can buy and sell secondhand electronics. It also provides price assessment services to assist both buyers and sellers in making informed transactions.

Paipai Marketplace has assumed responsibility for the second-hand, idle, inventory, and resale operations of 3C (computer, communication, and consumer electronics) categories on JD.com. It functions as a B2C retail platform, facilitating the re-commercialization of premium pre-owned consumer electronics.

AHS Device represents ATRenew's overseas expansion, with operations in regions including Southeast Asia, Latin America, and Africa. It has invested in mobile phone recycling companies, such as India's Cashify and Brazil's Trocafone. In Japan, AHS Device has partnered with Janpara to place self-service recycling kiosks, and it has collaborated with Finland-based Swappie to do the same in Sweden.

LOVERE (AiFenLei) specializes in garbage sorting and trash recycling services, designed to encourage households to increase their recycling efforts through financial incentives. It provides intelligent recycling machines and comprehensive waste management solutions. The LOVERE kiosks accept recyclable waste, rewarding users with credits on the WeChat app as an incentive.
