= University of Chicago Hong Kong =

Satellite campus of the University of Chicago in Hong Kong

Coordinates: 22.2751°N 114.1175°E

The Hong Kong Jockey Club University of Chicago Academic Complex | The University of Chicago Francis and Rose Yuen Campus in Hong Kong
- 香港賽馬會芝加哥大學教育綜合大樓 芝加哥大學袁天凡、慧敏校園
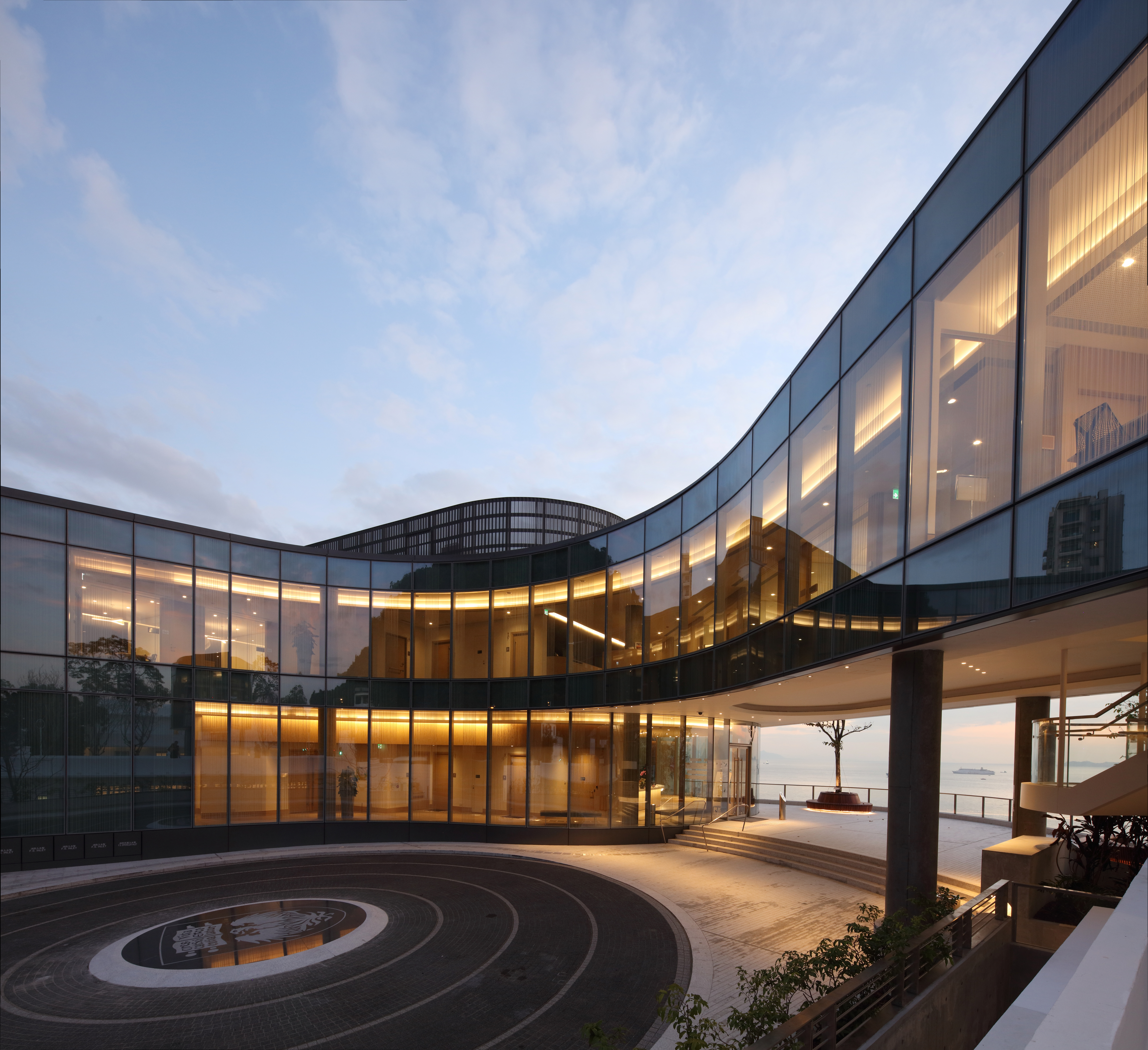
- Established: November, 2018
- Parent institution: University of Chicago
- Director: Mark Barnekow (Executive Director); Kenneth Pomeranz (Faculty Director)
- Location: 168 Victoria Road, Mount Davis, Hong Kong
- Website: uchicago.hk

The University of Chicago Hong Kong (officially The Hong Kong Jockey Club University of Chicago Academic Complex | The University of Chicago Francis and Rose Yuen Campus in Hong Kong) is an overseas campus of the University of Chicago in Mount Davis, Hong Kong. It was opened in November 2018.

The Hong Kong Jockey Club Charities Trust has a strong presence on the campus. In addition to providing institutional support, the Trust has been instrumental in building the Hong Kong Jockey Club University of Chicago Academic Complex, renovating the Hong Kong Jockey Club University of Chicago Heritage Courtyard and Interpretation Centre and creating The Hong Kong Jockey Club Program on Social Innovation which resides on the campus.

== Programs and events ==
The University of Chicago Hong Kong has become home to hundreds of faculty, graduate and undergraduate students across the entirety of all University of Chicago Schools and Divisions. It hosts dozens of academic workshops, conferences, and public lectures each year. Since its inception in 2018, the Yuen Campus has been a destination for faculty and students of the College Study Abroad, Chicago Booth's Executive MBA, Executive Education, the Polsky Center for Entrepreneurship and Innovation and the Rustandy Center for Social Sector Innovation.

=== Study Abroad ===
The campus contributes to the university's wider engagement in Asia and supports the growing opportunities for learning and research collaborations in Hong Kong. The College offers a study abroad programs at the Hong Kong campus in Global Studies and Economics, led by faculty of the University of Chicago.

=== Executive MBA Program ===
The University of Chicago Booth School of Business teaches its Executive MBA Program at The University of Chicago Hong Kong. Students attend classes and study in the Hong Kong Jockey Club Academic Complex on the Yuen Campus. The University of Chicago Booth School of Business Executive MBA Program is registered under the Hong Kong Education Bureau.

=== Events ===
Since its opening, the campus has organized hundreds of in-person, hybrid and online activities including conferences, workshops, public talks, exhibitions, music concerts, etc. It has developed eight original series talks to showcase UChicago faculty and research, many times in partnerships with faculty from institutions around Asia and the world. These programs include the hybrid event Trailblazer Forum, The Course Podcast and The Yuen Campus Series webinars.

== Hong Kong Jockey Club University of Chicago Heritage Courtyard and Interpretation Centre ==
The site of the Hong Kong Jockey Club University of Chicago Heritage Courtyard and Interpretation Centre campus was originally part of the Jubilee Battery at Mount Davis, which formed part of Hong Kong's western coastal defence system. After World War II, it was occupied by makeshift housing for refugees before being converted into a British Army Royal Engineers’ mess and quarters. The site later became the Victoria Road Detention Centre under the Special Branch of the Hong Kong Police Force starting in 1961 and was simultaneously used for police training purposes.

In addition to authentic restoration of the site, the university has conducted extensive historical research and heritage interpretation exercises to examine and share the usage of the site and its interactions with larger communities throughout its history. Numerous interviews with historians, former detainees and other people associated with the site have been conducted. Six narratives based on evidence found on site and obtained from verifiable sources are presented in the Heritage Interpretation Centre. By focusing on the historic layers, the Centre hopes to share the historical significance of the site and to relate it to the history of Hong Kong in a broader context. The campus is the first architectural project in Hong Kong to receive the international design award The Prix Versailles.

=== Heritage Tours ===
As the campus is built on a historically important site at Mount Davis, Hong Kong, guided tours are offered to visitors who will see the revitalized Grade 3 heritage buildings and tour The Hong Kong Jockey Club University of Chicago Heritage Courtyard and Interpretation Centre (HCIC).

== Organization and faculty ==
The campus is currently managed by Executive Director Mark Robert Barnekow (MBA’88) and the Faculty Director, Chairperson of the Faculty Advisory Board Kenneth Pomeranz.

=== Faculty Advisory Board Members ===
- Chin-tu Chen
- Fred Chong
- Chang-Tai Hsieh
- Kimberly Kay Hoang
- Randall S. Kroszner
- Haun Saussy
- Scott, Stern, MD
- Dali Yang
- Alan Yu
- Judith Zeitlin

=== Faculty ===
The University of Chicago provides funding and grants to support faculty activities and research with a strong collaborative element in Hong Kong, the Greater Bay Area of Mainland China and throughout North East and South East Asia. The funding aims to activate and amplify relationships, spark academic engagement between the University of Chicago and partners in the region, and increase the local impact of the university’s research and faculty experts in both academic and public settings.

=== Funding ===
The Hong Kong Jockey Club University of Chicago Academic Complex | The University of Chicago Francis and Rose Yuen Campus in Hong Kong is named after its two major donors.

The construction of the Hong Kong Jockey Club Academic Complex and the preservation of its heritage site are partially financed by the Social Impact Grant of the Hong Kong Jockey Club Charities Trust. The campus is also recognized through the financial support of many alumni and parent donors, the most significant of which is University Trustee Francis Tin Fan Yuen, AB’75, and his wife, Rose Wai Man Lee Yuen, who through their financial support have expressed their dedication to the University’s global engagement and their long-standing commitment to the University’s work in Hong Kong and Mainland China.
