= Fudan University =

Public university in Shanghai, China

Coordinates: 31°17′56″N 121°29′57″E

- 复旦大学
- Former names: Fudan Public School (1905); Fudan College; Private Fudan University (1917–1941); National Fudan University (1941–1949)
- Motto: 博学而笃志，切问而近思
- Motto in English: Rich in knowledge and tenacious of purposes, inquiring with earnestness and reflecting with self-practice
- Type: Public
- Established: 14 September 1905; 121 years ago
- Founder: Ma Xiangbo
- Affiliations: C9, Universitas 21, AEARU, APRU, BRICS Universities League, Council on Business & Society, ASRMU
- President: Jin Li
- Party Secretary: Qiu Xin (裘新)
- Faculty: 2,700
- Administrative staff: 5,800
- Students: 31,900
- Undergraduates: 14,100
- Postgraduates: 14,800
- Location: 220 Handan Rd., Yangpu District, Shanghai, China
- Campus: 604 acres (244 ha)
- Website: fudan.edu.cn

Chinese name
- Simplified Chinese: 复旦大学
- Traditional Chinese: 復旦大學
Transcriptions
Standard Mandarin
- Hanyu Pinyin: Fùdàn Dàxué
- Bopomofo: ㄈㄨˋ ㄉㄢˋ ㄉㄚˋ ㄒㄩㄝˊ
- Wade–Giles: Fu^{4}-tan^{4} Ta^{4}-hsüeh^{2}
- Tongyong Pinyin: Fù-dàn Dà-syué
- IPA: [fû.tân tâ.ɕɥě]

Fudan University (FDU) is a public university in Yangpu, Shanghai, China. It is affiliated with the Ministry of Education and is co-funded with the Shanghai Municipal Government. The university is part of Project 211, Project 985, and the Double First-Class Construction.

The university was originally founded by the Chinese Jesuit priest Ma Xiangbo in 1905. It is a member of the C9 League.

== History ==
=== 1905–1917: college-preparatory school ===
The university traces its origins to Fudan College, established in 1905 by Chinese Jesuit priest Ma Xiangbo. Prior to founding Fudan, Ma had established Aurora College, where the Society of Jesus frequently opposed and intervened in student movements. This led Ma to create a new institution, Fudan College, as a preparatory school for higher education with government funding, offering three-year education for general or specialised tracks. After the 1911 Revolution, Fudan continued to offer general rather than specialised education.

=== 1917–1941: private university ===
Fudan became a private university in 1917, establishing specialised departments including Chinese literature, foreign literature, banking, business and administration, economics, politics, civil engineering and psychology. In 1921, university preparatory education was ended and the university began to adopt an American-styled credit and elective system, per a national policy. In 1928, Fudan was registered with the Ministry of Education of the newly founded Nationalist government. In 1929, the university was organized into four faculties, namely Liberal Arts, Science, Law and Commerce. In 1937, it moved to Chongqing due to the outbreak of the Second Sino-Japanese War.

=== 1941–1949: national university ===
In 1941, with the approval from the Nationalist government, the university was transformed from a private university to a national university, which allowed the government to control Fudan's major posts, including the president, provost and dean. In early 1946, the university returned to Shanghai. In China under Chiang Kai-shek and the Kuomintang, Fudan University was tasked with providing a Western-style education to Chinese students to support the country's economic reconstruction efforts.

=== 1949–1976: Mao Zedong era ===
In 1949, the university was taken over by the Shanghai Military Control Commission of the Chinese Communist Party (CCP), as the CCP defeated the Kuomintang in the Chinese civil war. By 1952, the CCP remodelled the Chinese higher education based on the Soviet model, leading to the inclusion of Communist ideology in Fudan's educational offerings. Fudan was transformed into a Soviet-style comprehensive university, with departments of arts and science of other universities merged into Fudan, leaving Fudan the only university to provide basic science and arts in Shanghai. In China under Mao Zedong, Fudan University was tasked with transmitting socialist values to further the agenda of the CCP. During the Cultural Revolution, the teaching at Fudan was completely halted due to political turmoils.

=== 1976 to present ===
In 2000, Fudan University merged with Shanghai Medical University, which was founded as the Fourth National Chungshan University School of Medicine in 1927, to form the new Fudan University.

In December 2019, Fudan University changed its constitution, removing the phrase "academic independence and freedom of thought" and including a "pledge to follow the Communist party's leadership", leading to protests among the students. It also said that Fudan University had to "equip its teachers and employees" with "Xi Jinping Thought", leading to concerns about the diminishing academic freedom of Fudan.

The university set up a 1 billion yuan fund of funds for startup innovation in 2023 as well as launching what it claims to be China's largest cloud-based scientific research computing platform CFFF.

The Hungarian government made an agreement to open the first campus of Fudan University outside China in Budapest in 2024. The expansion would cost 540 billion HUF, of which 450 billion would be paid by the Hungarian state from a Chinese loan. The construction would be mainly done by Chinese companies. Hungarian education professionals and politicians denounced the investment, citing economics, higher education and national security concerns.

== Campus ==
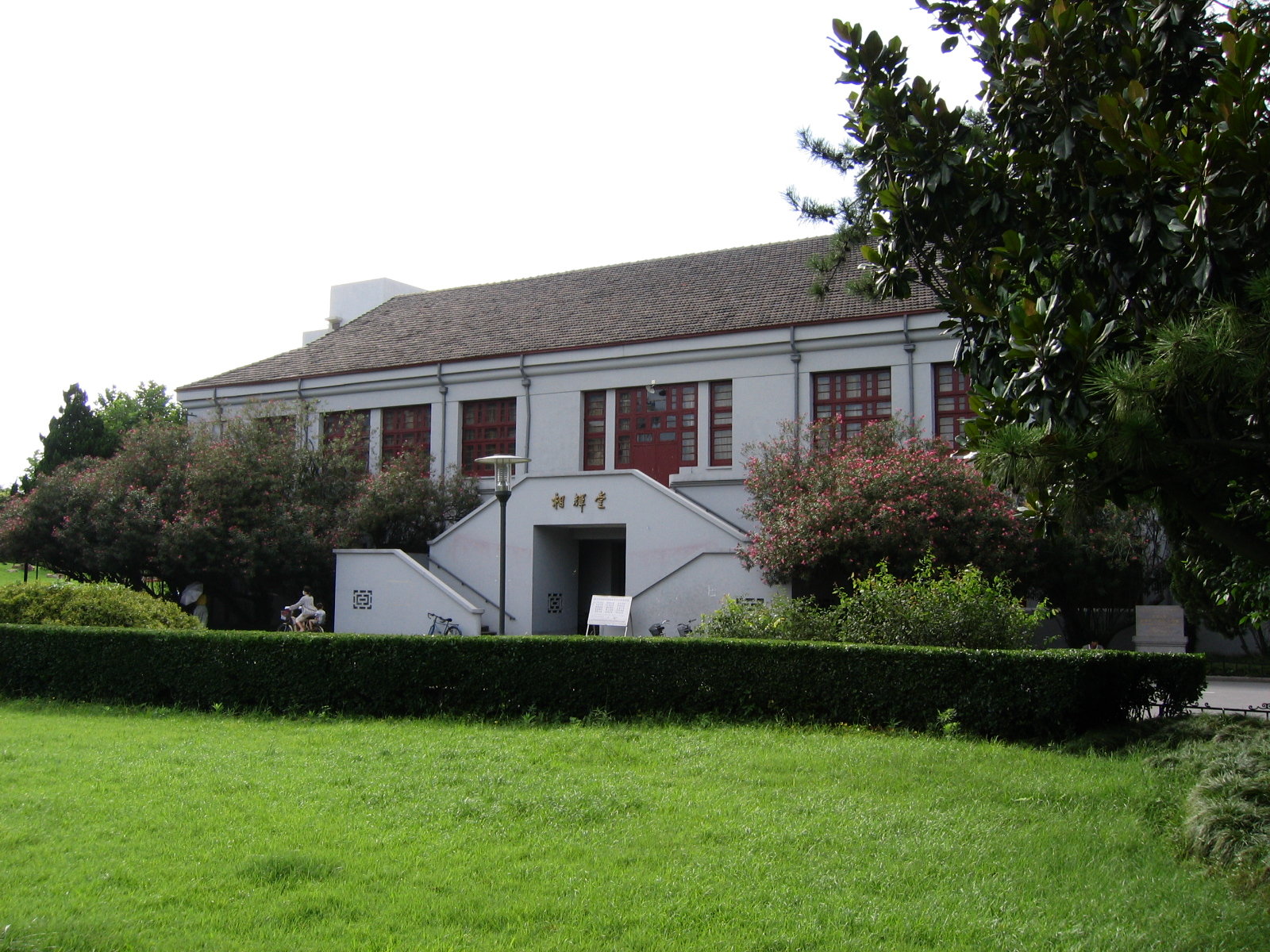
Xianghui Auditorium

Fudan has five undergraduate colleges – Zhide (志德), Tengfei (腾飞), Keqing (克卿), Renzhong (任重), and Xide (希德).

The university has four campuses in Shanghai – Handan (邯郸), Fenglin (枫林), Zhangjiang (张江), and Jiangwan (江湾) – that share the same central administration. It also has 17 affiliated hospitals.

== Academic profile ==
=== International links ===
As of 2024, Fudan has joint MBA programs in the school of management with MIT Sloan School of Management in the US (since 1996, leading to a Fudan degree), BI Norwegian Business School in Norway (since 1996, leading to a BI Norwegian Business School degree), the University of Hong Kong in Hong Kong (leading to a University of Hong Kong degree), and Washington University in St. Louis in the US (leading to a WUSTL degree). There are also a double degree in international management with Bocconi University and Luiss University in Italy (since 2005, leading to a master's in international management from one of the Italian universities), an executive MBA with National Taiwan University, and a global master's in management with London Business School (leading to degrees from both institutions).

The school of economics has had a partnership with Durham University Business School in England to deliver a Doctor of Business Administration (DBA) degree awarded by Durham University since 2006, with the first students starting in 2007. As of 2024, Fudan remains the main location, but some elements of the course are also delivered at Durham and in San Francisco, USA.

Fudan, Korea University Business School in Korea, and the National University of Singapore in Singapore have collaborated on the S3 Asia MBA since 2008, with students spending six months at each of the institutions. Fudan students receive a dual degree from Fudan and one of the other universities in the collaboration.

Beyond business education, Fudan University has developed an international research partnerships with the UK's Tyndall Centre for Climate Change Research from 2011 through the Fudan-Tyndall Centre, focusing on climate change and sustainable development.

The Fudan Institute for Global Public Policy collaborates through academic hubs at international institutions, including the LSE-Fudan Research Centre for Global Public Policy (with the London School of Economics) and the Fudan-Arab Research Centre for Global Development and Governance (focused on the Middle East and North Africa).

=== Reputation and rankings ===
University rankings
BCUR National	Domestic	5
Wu Shulian National	Domestic	7
CUAA National	Alumni	4
QS National	General	3
THE National	General	3
QS Asia (Asia version)	General	5
THE Asia (Asia version)	General	7
ARWU World	Research	41
QS World	General	26
THE World	General	36
USNWR World	General	49

==== Subject rankings ====
QS World University Rankings by Subject 2024
Subject	Global	National
Arts & Humanities	▲75	3
Linguistics	▼ =76	▼3
Theology, Divinity and Religious Studies	▼101–140	1
Archaeology	51–100	2
Architecture and Built Environment	101–150	10–13
Art and Design	▼201–240	▲7–9
Classics and Ancient History	▼50	3
English Language and Literature	▲ =91	3
History	51–100	2
Modern Languages	▼26	2
Philosophy	▼151–200	▼4–8
Engineering and Technology	▼ =111	▲7
Engineering – Chemical	63	5
Computer Science and Information Systems	▲40	5
Data Science and Artificial Intelligence	=49	4
Engineering – Electrical and Electronic	▲ =81	▲6
Engineering – Mechanical	▲ =89	▲8
Life Sciences & Medicine	▼92	▼4
Anatomy and Physiology	51–100	▼5–6
Biological Sciences	▲63	▼4
Medicine	▲64	▼3
Nursing	51–100	1–4
Pharmacy and Pharmacology	▲53	▼4
Psychology	101–150	▼5–7
Natural Sciences	▲51	4
Chemistry	▲ =32	▲3
Earth and Marine Sciences	151–200	8–14
Environmental Sciences	▼ =130	▼10–11
Geography	▼51–100	3–7
Geology	151–200	11–16
Materials Sciences	▼44	5
Mathematics	▲43	4
Physics and Astronomy	▼57	▼4
Social Sciences & Management	▼56	3
Accounting and Finance	▼ =51	4
Anthropology	101–150	2
Business and Management Studies	▼ =47	4
Communication and Media Studies	▼101–150	3–4
Development Studies	51–100	1–2
Economics and Econometrics	▲ =45	3
Education and Training	151–200	6
Hospitality and Leisure Management	51–100	▲1–3
Law and Legal Studies	▼101–150	▼8
Library and Information Management	51–70	▲4–6
Politics	▼ =47	▼3
Social Policy and Administration	51–100	▲2–4
Sociology	▼101–150	4–6
Statistics and Operational Research	51–100	4–6

THE World University Rankings by Subject 2024
Subject	Global	National
Arts & humanities	▼151–175	▼5–7
Business & economics	▲ =42	▲4–5
Clinical & health	▲ =38	3
Computer science	▲73	7
Education	▼126–150	6
Engineering	▼ =56	▼7–8
Life sciences	42	3
Physical sciences	▼29	3
Social sciences	▲101–125	▲3–5

ARWU Global Ranking of Academic Subjects 2023
Subject	Global	National
Natural Sciences
Mathematics	▲36	2
Physics	▲51–75	▲6–8
Chemistry	▲21	▼10
Earth Sciences	▲151–200	▼20–27
Geography	151–200	▼17–25
Ecology	▲201–300	▲10–16
Atmospheric Science	▲32	7
Engineering
Biomedical Engineering	▼12	▼7
Materials Science & Engineering	▲20	▲10
Nanoscience & Nanotechnology	▲9	7
Energy Science & Engineering	▼40	▼26
Environmental Science & Engineering	▲31	▼11
Biotechnology	▲32	18
Life Sciences
Biological Sciences	▲76–100	▼6
Human Biological Sciences	▲51–75	1
Medical Sciences
Clinical Medicine	▲151–200	▲3–6
Public Health	76–100	5–8
Dentistry & Oral Sciences	201–300	▼23–30
Nursing	▲101–150	▲19–26
Medical Technology	▲76–100	▲3
Pharmacy & Pharmaceutical Sciences	▲41	▼6
Social Sciences
Economics	▲76–100	▲8–13
Statistics	▲35	1
Political Sciences	301–400	▼14–25
Psychology	▲201–300	▲8–12
Business Administration	151–200	▼16–19
Finance	▲51–75	▲10–14
Management	▲76–100	▲11–18
Public Administration	151–200	9–12
Hospitality & Tourism Management	▼51–75	▼12–18
Library & Information Science	▲34	▼10

==== Research output rankings ====
Regarding research output in natural science and life science, the Nature Index Research Leaders 2024 ranked Fudan the No.9 university in the Asia Pacific region, and 12th in the world among the global universities. The 2024 CWTS Leiden Ranking ranked Fudan 11th in the world based on their publications for the time period 2019–2022.

== Notable alumni ==
Since 1952, Fudan University has a total of 95 academicians alumni, second only to Peking University and Tsinghua University in China. Fudan's notable alumni include:

- Chen Yinke (1890–1969), historian, linguist, orientalist, politician, and writer.
- Chen Wangdao (1891–1977), scholar and educator recognized as the first and only person to translate The Communist Manifesto into Chinese completely
- Chen Zhili (born 1942), politician
- Chu Coching, geologist and meteorologist
- David Ji (born 1952), Chinese-American electronics entrepreneur who co-founded Apex Digital, and was held against his will in China for months without charges during a business dispute
- Kerry Chen, entrepreneur, founder and CEO of ATRenew
- Yan Fu, military officer, newspaper editor, translator, and writer known for introducing Western ideas to China in the late 19th century
- Yu Youren, educator, scholar, calligrapher, and politician
- Wang Huning (born 1955), political theorist and a top leader of the Chinese Communist Party.

== See also ==
- Auto-ID Labs
- S3 Asia MBA – Joint MBA program by Fudan University, Korea University and NUS Business School
