= Korea University Business School =

Business school in Seoul, South Korea

Coordinates: 37.59342°N 127.04680°E

- 고려대학교 경영대학
- Other names: KUBS
- Type: Private
- Established: May 5, 1905; 121 years ago
- Parent institution: Korea University
- Accreditation: AACSB, EQUIS
- Dean: Eonsoo Kim
- Academic staff: 83 (Full-time)
- Location: Seoul, South Korea
- Campus: Urban
- Website: biz.korea.ac.kr/en/

Korean name
- Hangul: 고려대학교 경영대학
- Hanja: 高麗大學校 經營大學
- RR: Goryeo daehakgyo gyeongyeong daehak
- MR: Koryŏ taehakkyo kyŏngyŏng taehak

Korea University Business School (KUBS; Korean: 고려대학교 경영대학) is the business school of Korea University in Seoul, South Korea. It was formed in 1946, becoming the first business school established in Korea.

The school offers an undergraduate program, full-time and part-time MBA programs, MS/PhD programs, as well as a few other non-degree programs. It received Korea's first accreditation from AACSB in 2005 and EQUIS in 2007, respectively.

== History ==
Korea University Business School was the first university department in Korea to introduce business studies. Founded in 1905 as part of Bosung College, the institution initially had two departments: Plutology (the study of wealth) and Law. Plutology later evolved into Commercial Science and subsequently into the modern business school at Korea University.

Korea University was the only university in Korea teaching business until 1917. In that year, Yonhi College, which is now Yonsei University, started its Commercial Science Department. KUBS was instrumental in bringing Western-style business education to Korea. In 1937, it opened the Business & Economics course, which influenced the adoption of German business studies in the country.

After Korea University was officially recognized as a university in 1946, the Economics & Commercial Science College established the Commercial Science Department. In 1952, KUBS graduated Korea's first Master of Business Administration (MBA) graduate, Professor Yun Byeong-uk. It launched the KU Business & Commerce Journal the next year, which was Korea's first academic business journal. In 1955, Korea University launched the Department of Business Administration. KUBS established the Center for Business Research & Education in 1958, contributing greatly to Korean business research. The center’s 1959 study of 2,500 businesses remains an important example of on-site business analysis. In 1960, the center issued the Business Newspaper, introducing new business theories and contributing to industry development.

In 1963, the Graduate School of Business Administration at Korea University opened and started to accept MBA students. During a time of government-initiated education reforms, the school's name changed to the Professional Graduate School of Business Administration. From 2007 to 2011, KUBS topped the government's BK21 project in the areas of teachers, curriculum, and infrastructure. In 2013, KUBS was the only business school chosen for the BK21 PLUS project. Korea University's Graduate School of International Studies (GSIS) has also been chosen as one of the institutions to implement Phase 4 of the BK21 program, with the project running from September 2020 to August 2027.

KUBS developed several programs such as foreign internships, hiring of foreign and female professors, and the launch of the Business Forum, the Video Education Center, and the Asian Institute of Corporate Governance. KUBS became the first Korean business school to be accredited by the Association to Advance Collegiate Schools of Business with AACSB in 2005 and by the European Foundation for Management Development with EQUIS in 2007. KUBS also received re-accreditation for both in 2010 and 2015.

== Academics ==
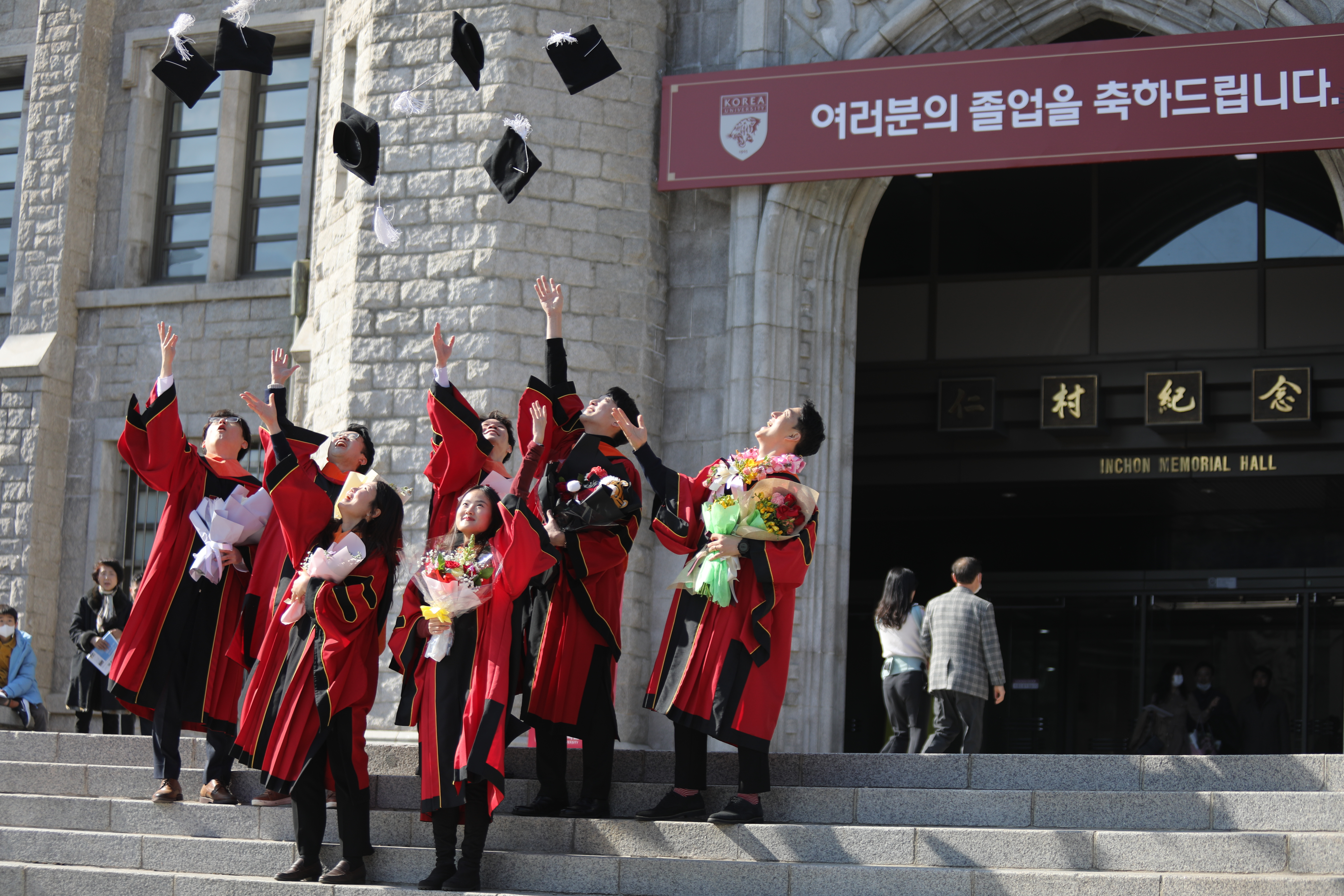
Graduation of students of Korea University Business School

Korea University Business School offers undergraduate, graduate, and doctorate programs focused on business education. The undergraduate program allows students to participate in courses such as management, international business, marketing, finance, accounting, LSOM (Logistics and Supply Chain Management), MIS (Information Systems), and 3 elective options for specialization, that are business analytics, entrepreneurship and innovation, social value and sustainability in business. The MBA programs include a full-time MBA, an executive MBA for professionals, and a global MBA with an international focus. Korea University Business School (KUBS) also offers advanced programs such as the Master of Business Administration (MBA), Master in Management (MIM), and Doctor of Business Administration (DBA). The school also offers MS and PhD programs that emphasize research in business disciplines. The academic calendar follows a semester system, with fall and spring terms.

=== Programs ===
==== Undergraduate ====
- Core Courses: Management, International Business, Marketing, Finance, Accounting, Logistics and Supply Chain Management (LSOM), Information Systems (MIS)
- Specialization Electives: Business Analytics, Entrepreneurship and Innovation, Social Value and Sustainability in Business
- Degree: Bachelor of Business Administration (BBA)

==== Graduate ====
- Master of Business Administration (MBA) Programs:
  - Full-Time MBA
  - Executive MBA (EMBA)
  - Finance MBA
  - Global MBA
- Other Advanced Programs:
  - Master in Management (MIM)
  - Doctor of Business Administration (DBA)

==== Doctorate ====
- Master of Science (MS) and Doctor of Philosophy (PhD)

=== Academic Support ===
==== Jeongjincho ====
Jeongjincho is a CPA preparation program at Korea University designed to assist students in preparing for the Certified Public Accountant (CPA) exam. In the 54th CPA examination, Korea University had 109 successful candidates and 205 students who passed the first round. Korea University has seen a consistent number of successful CPA candidates over the years, with a total of 854 candidates passing the exam from 2012 to 2019. In multiple years, the university has had more than 200 students pass the first round of the exam.

==== Takmajeong ====
Takmajeong is a preparation program at Korea University for students preparing for the National Exam for Higher Civil Service. The program offers students necessary infrastructure and administrative support to aid their studies, with additional opportunities to meet successful alumni, including those working at top domestic accounting firms. The name "Takmajeong" combines the Korean words "jeolchatakma" (meaning "cutting and polishing") and "jeong" (which refers to a training group from the Silla Dynasty). Over the years, a significant number of Korea University students who have participated in Takmajeong have succeeded in the National Exam for Higher Civil Service. Takmajeong also organizes an annual event where alumni visit current members to provide guidance and encouragement.

== Accreditations and Rankings ==
Korea University Business School has consistently been in the top 100 since 2011. It has been running "The KUBS Worldwide Business Research Ranking" since 2015. KUBS has been teaching many business practitioners for over 110 years and remains a top business school in South Korea and beyond. Korea University Business School currently holds five-year accreditation from AACSB (Association to Advance Collegiate Schools of Business) and EQUIS (European Quality Improvement System). In addition, KUBS is ratified as a full academic member of CEMS. KUBS received Korea's first accreditation for its entire degree program in 2005 and has consecutively achieved a five-year accreditation in 2010, 2015, and 2020 by AACSB. KUBS received EQUIS accreditation and five-year re-accreditation in February 2007 and June 2010, respectively.

In February 2022, KUBS achieved a five-year re-accreditation for the third consecutive time. In 2021 Top 100 Executive MBA rankings by Financial Times, UK, KUBS's Executive MBA placed first in Korea, 20th in the world. In the 2022 QS World University Rankings, Korea University is ranked 48th for Business & Management and 59th for Accounting & Finance. Korea University Business School, led by Dean Kim Eonsoo, ranked 62nd globally in the 2024 Financial Times (FT) Top 100 Executive MBA Programs, improving 18 places from its position of 80th in 2023. The Executive MBA program at KUBS targets senior managers with over 10 years of experience. It offers a range of specialized programs, including 'CEO Special Topics,’ the ‘ELITE Project,’ the ‘International Residency Program (IRP),’ and the ‘Junior SMART Camp,’ aimed at preparing executives to lead in a fast-changing global business environment. For the Spring 2024 semester, the IRP included visits to ESADE in Barcelona (Spain), and Yale University in the U.S.

== Global partnerships ==
As of 2022, KUBS has exchange partnerships with 103 universities from 32 countries where students have the opportunity to participate in the exchange program. As a member of CEMS, the Global Alliance in Management Education, the school has 34 CEMS Alliance partner schools. In addition, KUBS currently students have the opportunity to participate in an internship at partner companies across the world. Since 1994, students have interned overseas through KUBS Global Internship program and received academic credits.

| Continent | List of partner universities |
|---|---|
| North America | Ross School of Business, University of Michigan, Washington University in St. Louis, the U.S., University of British Columbia, McGill University, Canada |
| Europe | ESCP Business School, ESSEC Business School, France, EBS University of Business and Law, Germany, Bocconi University, Italy |
| Asia | Fudan University, Tsinghua University, China and National University of Singapore, Singapore |

== Notable alumni ==
KUBS has a strong alumni network throughout industries.

- Chung Mong-Jin, CEO and President of KCC Corporation
- Chung Mong-Won, Chairman of Halla Corporation
- Chung Mong-gyu, Chairman of Hyundai Development Company Group
- Chung Eui-sun, Vice Chairman of Hyundai Motor Company
- Euh Yoon-dae, Former Chairman of KB Financial Group
- Huh Chang-soo, Chairman of GS Holdings Group
- Kim Seungyu, Former Chairman & CEO of Hana Financial Group
- Koo Bon-neung, Chairman of Heesung Group
- Koo Ja-yeol, chairman and CEO of LS Partnership
- Koo Ja-Yong, chairman and CEO of E1 Corporation
- Lee Hak-Su, Former Vice Chairman of Samsung Electronics
- Lee Myung-bak, Former President of South Korea, Former CEO of Hyundai Engineering and Construction
- Lee Woong Yeul, Chairperson of KOLON
- Na Wan-Bae, Former CEO of GS Energy Corporation
- Park Hyeon-Joo, Chairman of Mirae Asset Financial Group
- Seung Myung-Ho, chairman and CEO of Dongwha Enterprise Co. Ltd.

== Facilities ==
Korea University Business School has facilities in three buildings: KUBS Main Building, LG-POSCO Hall, and Hyundai Motor Hall, of which all of them are located next to one another.

=== KUBS Main Building ===
The KUBS Main Building, built in 1972, was renovated in 2016 to incorporate the KUBS Startup Institute. The renovation took three months, starting in July, and was aimed at updating the building with modern technological facilities while preserving the long history of the business school. The building covers a total area of 6,097 square meters and includes key academic and administrative support spaces. On the first floor locates the Dean’s Office, Associate Dean’s Offices, Faculty Lounge, and other administrative offices. The second floor houses the KUBS Startup Institute, while administrative offices, including the International Office and Career Hub, are located on the third floor. Faculty offices, the Student Council Office, and student facilities like the KUBS Ladies Lounge are on the fourth floor. The top floor contains faculty offices, MS/PhD offices, and a Fitness Center.

=== LG-POSCO Building ===
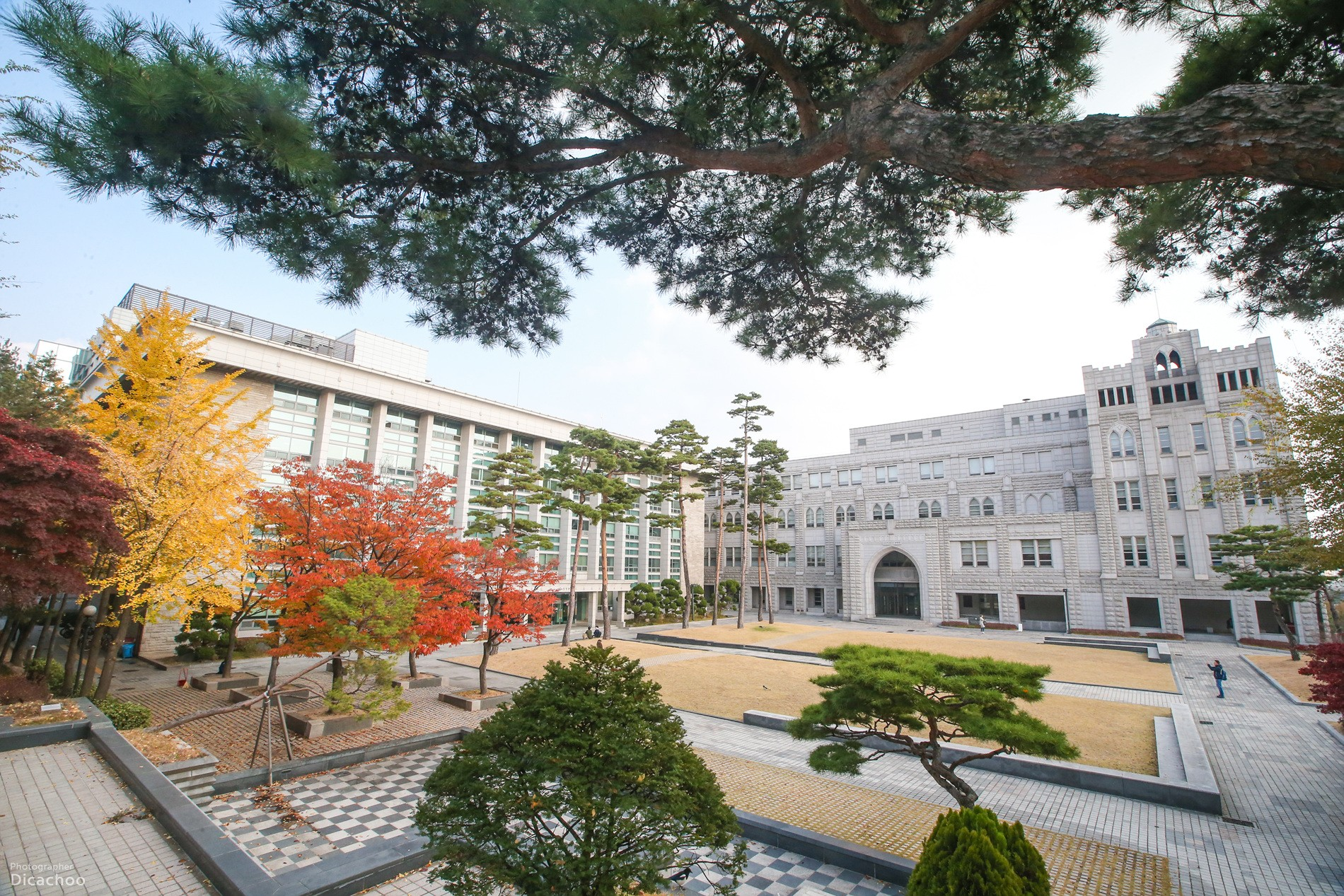
LG-POSCO Hall, opened in commemoration of the 100th anniversary of Korea University

The LG-POSCO Building, inaugurated in 2005 to commemorate the centenary of Korea University’s founding, was developed with the aim of establishing a prominent business school in Asia. The building focuses on areas such as research, business-academia collaboration, and international exchanges. It operates under the T.I.G.E.R.S. framework, which stands for Technical Leadership, Industry Leadership, Entrepreneur Leadership, Research Leadership, and Service Leadership. The building, which was completed in October 2003, spans six stories and covers a total area of 14,121 square meters. It houses various facilities, including lecture rooms, faculty offices, the Lee Myung-bak Lounge, Supex Hall, and the Sudang Digital Library, which was established to honor the legacy of Sudang Kim Yeon Soo, the founder of Samyang, and Kim Sang Hong (Class of 1941), an alumnus, Honorary President of Samyang, and the first President of the Korea University Business School (KUBS) alumni association. The building includes several facilities. Supex Hall, located on the fourth level, is equipped with a sound system and simultaneous translation capabilities. It is used for lectures and events. The Sudang Digital Library offers a search system for business-related books, journals, and digital documents. It also provides access to the Bloomberg terminal, which allows users to track global stock market trends. The circle-shaped lecture room features a seating arrangement along a half-circle, centered around the platform.

=== Hyundai Motor Hall ===
Hyundai Motor Hall was completed in September 2013 with the goal of offering a new business perspective for the 21st century, integrating humanities and culture into an era focused on Asia-centered business practices. Hyundai Motor Hall is the third building constructed for Korea University Business School. The building has five above-ground levels and four underground levels, covering a total area of 15,470 square meters. It contains 28 faculty offices, 16 lecture rooms equipped with advanced technology, and 51 group study rooms that students can reserve through an online reservation system. Hyundai Motor Hall was funded through contributions from over 3,600 sponsors, raised between December 2009 and September 2013. Lee Du-Hui, the former Dean of Korea University Business School, who oversaw the building's construction, noted, "We appreciate all the support contributed to the construction of Hyundai Motor Hall. I believe this will contribute to the goal of improving the school’s global ranking and its position in Asia."

Hyundai Motor Hall offers various facilities to support academic and extracurricular activities. Lounges are also provided on each floor to assist KUBS students in group work and serve as a rest area during breaks. These lounges are named after donors, including Lee Sang-il & Lee Dong-seop Hall (B3), Student Lounge (B2, 2F), KCC Lounge (B1), Jejasarang Lounge (B1), Namchon Lounge (B2), Hwang Ye-sik & Jo Ye-haeng Gallery (3F), and Namyeong Lounge (4F).. The Open Theater provides students with access to cultural facilities that encourage creativity and leadership. The Open Gallery has redefined the lobby area, transforming it from a simple entrance to a cultural space where visitors can appreciate various works of art. Hyundai Motor Hall has six group study rooms on underground levels 1–3 and ground levels 2–4, employed to facilitate team communication. Lounges on each floor are interaction and collaboration spaces for the students. Floating Floor, which is between the 3rd and 4th level, is among the striking architectural designs in the building. This architectural aspect represents the KUBS spirit by incorporating the idea of transgressing bounds as the building appears suspended mid-air. The Circle-Shaped Lecture Room is created to enhance student involvement, providing a liberal and liberalized area for intense learning and argument. There is also a locker room area designed to provide room for student autonomy. The first underground level is dedicated to student spaces, such as a multimedia lounge, cafeteria, and open theater. 1,032 lockers are featured throughout the building, located across ground levels 2–4 and subterranean levels 2–3.

== See also ==
- S^{3} Asia MBA - Joint MBA program by Fudan University, Korea University and NUS Business School
