= Anant Agarwal =

Indian computer architecture researcher

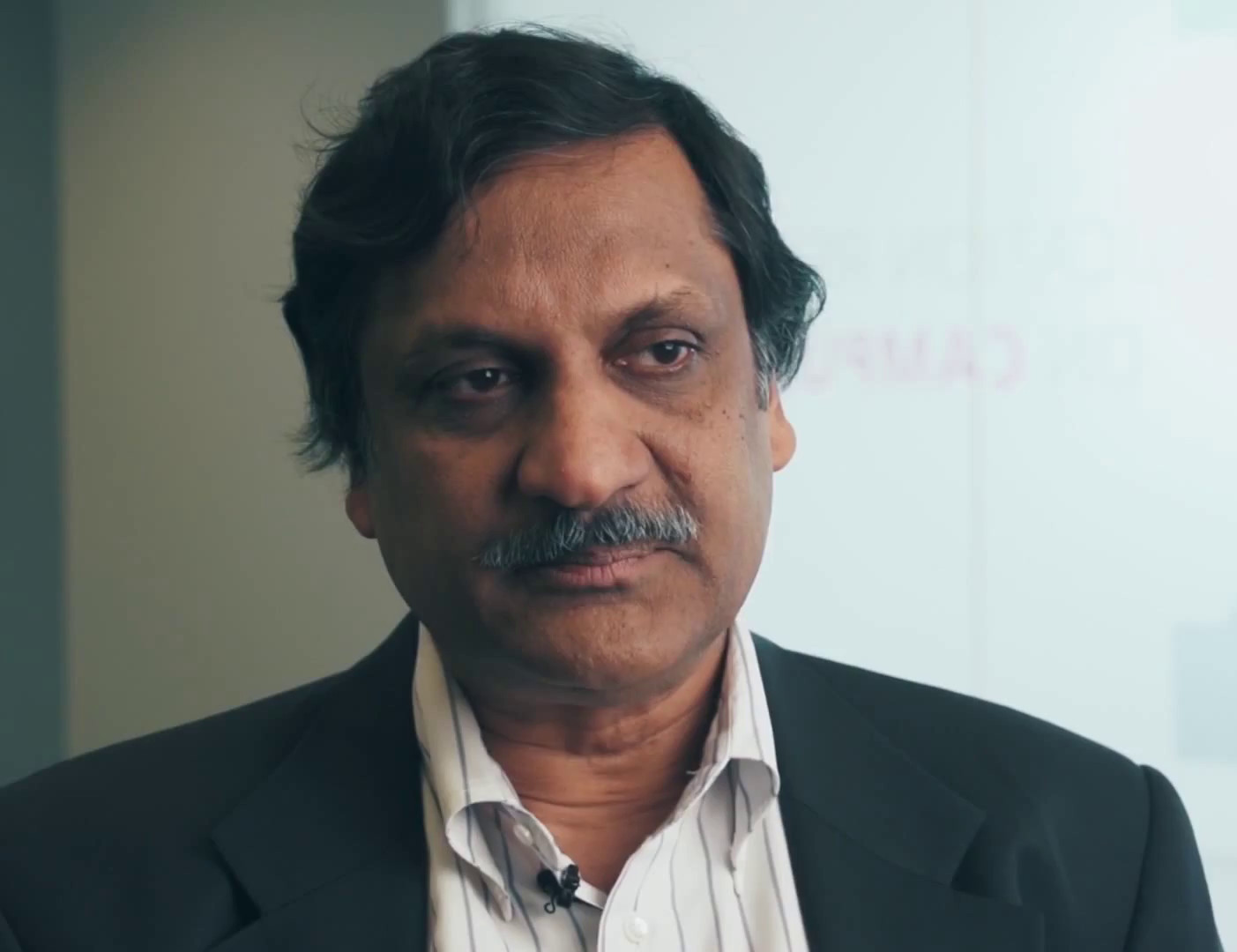
- Agarwal in 2015
- Born: 8 June 1959 (age 67); Mangalore, Mysore State, India (now Mangaluru, Karnataka)
- Occupations: Professor, researcher
- Known for: MOOC edX; MITx
- Honours: Padma Shri (2017)
- Scientific career
- Fields: Computer architecture
- Thesis: Analysis of Cache Performance for Operating Systems and Multiprogramming
- Doctoral advisor: John L. Hennessy
- Doctoral students: Frederic T. Chong
- Website: people.csail.mit.edu/agarwal/

Anant Agarwal is an Indian computer architecture researcher. He is a professor of electrical engineering and computer science at the Massachusetts Institute of Technology (MIT), where he led the development of Alewife, an early cache coherent multiprocessor, and has been director of the MIT Computer Science and Artificial Intelligence Laboratory. He is the founder and CTO of Tilera, a fabless semiconductor company focusing on scalable multicore embedded processor design. He is the CEO of edX, a joint partnership between MIT and Harvard University that offers free online learning.

== Education ==
Anant Agarwal was born in Mangalore and did his schooling in St. Aloysius Mangalore. He holds a bachelor's degree (1982) in electrical engineering from Indian Institute of Technology Madras. For postgraduate study, he attended Stanford University, where he received an MS (1984) and a PhD (1987), both in electrical engineering. His PhD thesis, Analysis of Cache Performance for Operating Systems and Multiprogramming, was written under John L. Hennessy.

== Career ==
Agarwal is the CEO of Grady, a feedback and grading platform for higher education, and founder and former CEO of edX, a worldwide, online learning initiative of MIT and Harvard. He is a leader of the Carbon Project, which is developing new scalable multicore architectures, a new operating system for multicore and clouds called fos, and a distributed, parallel simulator for multicore and clouds called Graphite. He is a leader of the Angstrom Project, which is creating fundamental technologies for exascale computing. He contributes to WebSim, a web-based electronic circuits laboratory. He led the Raw Project at CSAIL, and is a founder of Tilera Corporation. Raw was an early tiled multicore processor with 16 cores. He also teaches the edX offering of MIT's 6.002 Circuits and Electronics.

In 2013, he was elected as a member into the National Academy of Engineering for contributions to shared-memory and multicore computer architectures.

His previous projects include Sparcle, a coarse-grain multithreaded (CGMT or switch-on-event SOE) microprocessor, Alewife, a scalable distributed shared memory multiprocessor, Virtual Wires, a scalable FPGA-based logic emulation system, LOUD, a beamforming microphone array, Oxygen, a pervasive human-centered computing project, and Fugu, a protected, multiuser multiprocessor.

== Awards ==
Agarwal received the 2001 Maurice Wilkes Award for computer architecture. In 2007 he was inducted as a Fellow of the Association for Computing Machinery. In 2011 he was appointed Director of MIT's Computer Science and Artificial Intelligence Laboratory. In 2013, he became a member of the National Academy of Engineering and was appointed the CEO of EdX. In March 2016, he was awarded the Harold W. McGraw, Jr. Prize in Education in higher education as an outstanding leader of the development of the Massive Open Online Course movement. In addition to that, he is also a Distinguished Alumnus of IIT Madras. He received Padma Shri, the fourth highest civilian award in the Republic of India in 2017. In 2018, he received the Yidan Prize for Education Research, the world's largest education award, i.e. USD four million.

== Publications ==
- Anant Agarwal and Jeffrey Lang (2005). Foundations of Analog and Digital Electronic Circuits. Morgan Kaufmann. ISBN 1-55860-735-8.
