= How to Fly a Horse =

2015 book by Kevin Ashton

How to Fly a Horse: The Secret History of Creation, Invention, and Discovery
- First edition
- Author: Kevin Ashton
- Language: English
- Subject: Political convictions
- Publisher: Doubleday
- Publication date: January 20, 2015
- Publication place: United States
- Media type: Print (Hardcover)
- Pages: 336
- ISBN: 0385538596

How to Fly a Horse: The Secret History of Creation, Invention, and Discovery is a 2015 non-fiction book by the technology pioneer Kevin Ashton. In the book, Ashton debunks many common myths about creativity and proposes that hard work, rather than creative genius, is the true source of innovation.

== Reception ==
Ben East of The Observer wrote, "[Ashton's] well chosen examples reinforce the idea that there is no magic or myth to creation or discovery, making this an approachable, thought-provoking book that encourages everyone to be the best they can be." Christine Sismondo of the Toronto Star similarly observed, "Creation isn't magic. Though the subtitle of How to Fly a Horse promises a 'secret history' of creation, the secret is, essentially, that there is no secret. Creativity is the result of hard work, learning the foundations and getting better at problem-solving. That's bad news for those hoping a bump on the head will lead to the design for the flux capacitor that transforms the DeLorean into a time machine. It's good news, however, for everyone else, since it means that creativity is accessible to anyone." The book was also praised by Amanda Erickson of The Washington Post, who nevertheless wrote, "At times, Ashton's book feels like a self-help guide, weighed down with trite insights and sayings that could just as well appear on your HR rep's calendar. Take this smattering, all from a single page: 'Everything arises from steps, not leaps.' 'Creation is execution, not inspiration.' 'Ideas are like deeds; they are abundant, and most of them never grow into anything.' Still, I found it reassuring to know that Mozart struggled with his compositions, toiling over them for weeks. Einstein worked for years on his most famous theory. And Kandinsky labored for five months to plan his apparently spontaneous painting, drawing 20 almost identical sketches."

The book was criticized by David Annand of The Daily Telegraph, however, who wrote, "According to its dust jacket, How To Fly a Horse belongs to a recently created genre called 'Smart Thinking', a post-Gladwellian classification, much of which is concerned with reducing complex socio-economic phenomena into platitudes that can be delivered at dinner parties. It seems to be elastic enough to include writers such as Daniel Kahneman and soi-disant corporate gurus who wrap their anecdotes in a motivational framework exhorting you to power up your confidence and pursue your dreams." Despite describing the book's anecdotes as "rather lovely," Annand concluded, "All told, I suspect there is actually only one thing that connects history's innovative geniuses: their library shelves are entirely empty of 'Smart Thinking'."
