= Edraak =

MOCC website in Arabic language

- Website: www.edraak.org
- Launched: 2013
- Current status: Active

Edraak is a non-profit massive open online course (MOOC) portal established by Queen Rania al Abdallah of Jordan for the promotion of knowledge in the Arab world. It is considered the first non-profit and pan-Arab online educational platform that offers courses for free to learners worldwide. The MOOC platform operates in partnership with the Harvard-Stanford-MIT consortium called edX and is headquartered in Amman.

== History ==
On May November 2013, the Queen Rania Foundation for Education and Development (QRF) launched Edraak. According to Queen Rania, Edraak was introduced for the Arab world to catch up to a future that befits its history. It is also stated that Edraak could help address problems that hinder the development of the Middle East and the Arab youth since it addresses the issues of risk-taking, effective partnerships, and the efficient use of knowledge, among others.

The Crown Prince of Abu Dhabi, Sheikh Mohamed bin Zayed Al Nahyan, is Rania's co-founder. Patrons and partners include Princess Sumaya University for Technology, the Mikati foundation, Arab Fund, the British Council, the American University of Beirut, Bayt, and the institutions behind edX.

== Initiatives ==
Edraak uses the open-source edX platform by edX, which also used by two global MOOC providers: XuetangX in China and the French Université Numérique.

Edraak has collaborated with several regional and international scholars from prestigious universities to design and deliver courses covering a number of disciplines such as entrepreneurship, communication, health, information technology, design, and filmmaking. Courses typically ran between 3 – 8 weeks. Among the pioneers that joined forces with QRF was the American University of Beirut that contributed two courses.

Courses from QRF are offered primarily in Arabic, but translations of courses from prestigious universities like Harvard and MIT are also available. At its launch, Edraak offered 10 courses.

- Intro to Computer Science & Programming
- Electricity & Circuits
- Journey in the Film Industry
- Children's Mental Health
- Effective Strategies for Job Search
- Shopping Yourself in the Job Market
- A Successful CV
- Confidence Awareness
- Citizenship in the Arab World
- Arabs: Where from and Where to?
- Business Communication
- Innovation in the Government
- Basic Skills for First Aid

Edraak is also seen as an employee training and recruitment platform for companies in the region. The varied nature of the online courses provides companies the opportunity to upgrade employee skills as workplace demands continuously increases. Through removing the language barriers and making knowledge accessible, Edraak may contribute to decreasing Arab's lagging behind the western world in education in knowledge and digital fluency.
