= Sanjay Sarma =

Indian mechanical engineer

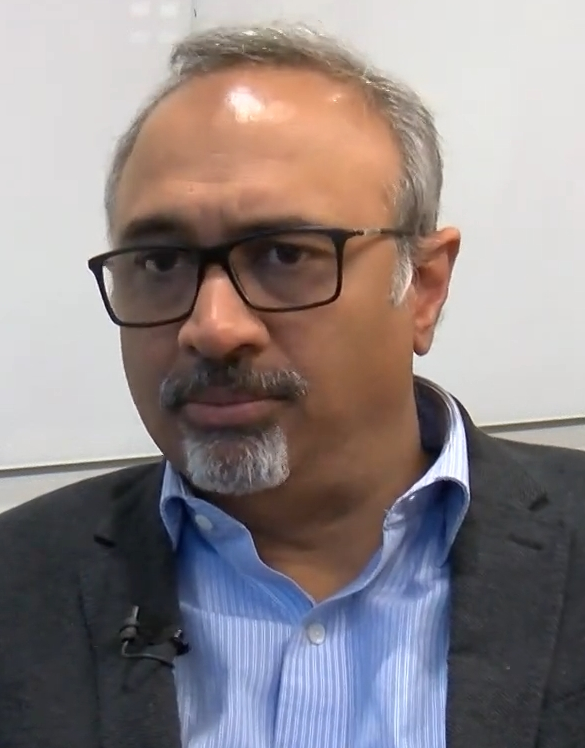
Sanjay Sarma in 2019

Sanjay E. Sarma is an Indian mechanical engineer academic and professor at MIT. Until May 2025, he was the CEO, President, and Dean of the Asia School of Business. Since 2025, he sits on the Board of Governors of the Asia School of Business. Additionally, he holds esteemed titles as the Fred Fort Flowers (1941) and Daniel Fort Flowers (1941) Professor of Mechanical Engineering, as well as vice president for Open Learning at the Massachusetts Institute of Technology.

Sarma's significant contributions to the commercial RFID industry include the development of various standards and technologies. Furthermore, he is a co-author of The Inversion Factor: How to Thrive in the IOT Economy (MIT Press, 2017), co-authored with Linda Bernardi and the late Kenneth Traub. In addition to his academic and industry roles, Sarma represents MIT on the board of the MOOC provider edX.

== Early life ==
Sarma completed his B.Tech. in Mechanical Engineering at the Indian Institute of Technology, Kanpur in 1989, followed by an ME from Carnegie Mellon University in 1992 and a Ph.D. from the University of California, Berkeley in 1995.

== Personal life ==
Sarma is the son of Dr. E. A. S. Sarma, who served as Secretary of the Government of India, noted for his work in various social causes and contributions to the energy sector. He is married to Dr. Gitanjali Swamy, the daughter of Dr. Subramanian Swamy, a notable Indian politician. They have one daughter.

== Career ==
Sarma commenced his professional journey at the Massachusetts Institute of Technology in 1996, following roles at Schlumberger, Inc. and Lawrence Berkeley Laboratories.

In 1998, Sarma, along with David Brock, began work on RFID research. Subsequently, in 1999, Sarma co-founded the Auto-ID Center at MIT alongside Sunny Siu and David Brock of MIT, and Kevin Ashton of P&G, with the objective of realizing the vision of standards-based RFID technology in commercial applications. The center was established as an industry-sponsored research project at MIT, aiming to develop a global open standard system for widespread RFID implementation. Initially serving as research director, Sarma later assumed the role of chairman of research after Siu's departure.

Under Sarma's leadership, in collaboration with Kevin Ashton, the center attracted 103 sponsors and expanded its reach by funding additional labs at major universities worldwide. Upon the development of the EPC System, MIT licensed it to the non-profit standards organization GS1, leading to the formation of EPCglobal and the successful culmination of the Auto-ID Center project. Subsequently, the center was rebranded as Auto-ID Labs, continuing its research endeavors. The Auto-ID Labs played a pivotal role in standardizing RFID technologies and establishing the foundation for the Internet of Things (IOT).

Sarma, in collaboration with Linda Bernardi and the late Kenneth Traub, co-authored The Inversion Factor: How to Thrive in the IoT Economy (MIT Press, 2017). The book traces the development of three distinct aspects of the IoT: the Internet of Things (devices connected to the internet), the Intelligence of Things (devices hosting software applications), and the Innovation of Things (devices evolving into experiences).

Sarma founded IoTask, a consultancy providing advisory services for the establishment and standardization of Internet of Things systems across diverse industry sectors. A frequent industry speaker, he holds positions on the boards of governors of EPCglobal and GS1 US, with a standing invitation as a guest of GS1. He also serves on the board of Hochschild Mining and holds roles as a technical advisor and board member at Top Flight Technologies. From 2012 to 2014, he chaired the board of EPCglobal. Previously, he served as CTO and director (board member) at OATSystems, a key player in the RFID market, which was acquired by Checkpoint Systems in 2008.

Sarma's achievements have earned him prestigious recognition, including the National Science Foundation CAREER Award, the Cecil and Ida Green Career Development Chair at MIT, the Den Hartog Award for Excellence in Teaching, the Keenan Award for Innovations in Undergraduate Education, the MacVicar Fellowship, and the New England Business and Technology Award. He has been featured on Business Week's 'e.biz 25 Innovators' list and Information Week's "Innovators and Influencers." In 2010, Sarma was honored with the inaugural RFID Journal Special Achievement Award. Furthermore, he has authored over 50 publications encompassing a wide range of topics, including computational geometry, virtual reality, manufacturing, CAD, RFID, security, and embedded computing.

Sarma frequently references the "Magic Formula" and the "Super Magic Formula" in his Dynamics lectures (MIT Course 2.003), many of which are available online. Beyond his work in Dynamics, Sarma also teaches manufacturing courses. Moreover, in 2011, he was appointed to MIT's Production in an Innovation Economy Commission, contributing to the publication of two books.

In November 2012, Sarma assumed the inaugural role of Director of Digital Learning at MIT, tasked with evaluating the impact of initiatives such as MITx and EdX on campus instruction. The MIT Office of Digital Learning, established in 2013, encompassed MITx and MIT's renowned OpenCourseWare project. Subsequently, Sarma was appointed Dean of Digital Learning. In April 2013, he was also designated as a co-chair of the Task Force for the Future of Education at MIT, which issued its final report in August 2014, presenting a series of recommendations for MIT's educational strategies both locally and globally.

Building upon the report's suggestions, in February 2015, MIT President L. Rafael Reif announced a significant expansion of MIT's programs in learning research and online and digital education, spanning from pre-kindergarten through higher education to lifelong learning. In this announcement, Sarma was appointed vice president for Open Learning, where he currently oversees the Office of Open Learning. Under Sarma's leadership, this office supervises MIT's digital learning initiatives, including MITx and MIT OpenCourseWare, as well as newly launched programs such as the MicroMasters Program, the MIT Integrated Learning Initiative (MITili), and the Abdul Latif Jameel World Education Lab (J-WEL).

Sarma's latest book, "Grasp," explores the reinvention of education based on his extensive experience in digital education and open learning.
