= E. A. S. Sarma =

Indian activist and civil servant (born 1941)

EAS Sarma
- Born: September 18, 1941 (age 85)
- Education: Andhra University, Master's degree in Nuclear Physics Harvard Kennedy School, Master’s degree in Public Administration IIT Delhi, Doctoral degree in Energy Planning
- Spouse: Rani Sarma
- Children: Sanjay Sarma
- Website: http://eassarma.in/

EAS Sarma is an activist and former civil servant of 1965-batch Indian Administrative Service from Andhra Pradesh. He has served as Secretary to the Government of India in the Ministries of Power and Finance.

== Career ==
Sarma joined the Indian Administrative Service in 1965 and served till 2000. In his 35-year tenure, he was transferred 26 times owing to his differences over policies. In 2000, as Economic Affairs Secretary, Sarma visited Washington, D.C., to sign an agreement establishing the India-United States Financial and Economic Forum. He took an early retirement in November 2000 from the finance ministry over differences in public policy issues with the Vajpayee-led NDA government. Post retirement, he headed the Administrative Staff College of India in Hyderabad. He was nominated as a member of the Indian Council of Social Science Research for a period of three years in April 2005.

== Advocacy ==
Sarma has been vocal about a wide range of public issues including demonetisation, transparency, development related displacement, environmental issues like thermal plants, mining in agency areas, and data centers in Visakhapatnam. His public interest litigation along with Ramachandra Guha and Nandini Sundar was crucial in Supreme Court declaring the Salwa Judum illegal.
