= MicroMasters =

Series of online graduate level courses offered by universities

MicroMasters programs are a series of online graduate level courses offered by universities through edX that one can take to develop standalone skills for career advancement or earn graduate level credentials.

First launched in September 2016 with 19 MicroMasters programs from 14 different universities as an extension of its MOOC programs. As of February 2019, 52 different MicroMasters programs are offered, with 48 in English, 3 in Spanish, and 1 in French. Each MicroMasters program is sponsored by at least one industry partner, including GE, Microsoft, IBM, Hootsuite, Fidelity, Bloomberg, Walmart, PWC, Booz-Allen Hamilton, and Ford.

== Background ==
=== History ===
The development of the MicroMasters was originally conceived at MIT by Sanjay Sarma and Erdin Beshimov, with Erdin becoming the Founding Director of the program. In its early stage MIT offered the MicroMasters as a pilot within its supply chain management program, consulting industry leaders. The idea of the MicroMasters program started out as an iteration of the existing MOOC model when Coursera first started offering specializations for its various disciplines and a response to the changing nature of work as well as the major skills shortage impacting businesses around the world. edX subsequently applied for a trademark for "MicroMasters" in response to Udacity registering "nanodegree" as its trademark in 2014. The first 19 MicroMasters programs were subsequently launched in September 2016, in collaboration with 14 different universities. This also included Rochester Institute of Technology's MicroMasters in project management, allowing learners to use it to fulfil the prerequisite of project management education for the PMP certification.

In 2017, General Electric promised to interview any Massachusetts resident who completed a MicroMasters program in supply chain management, cybersecurity, cloud computing, or artificial intelligence.

In 2018, MIT admitted its first batch of 40 students into its blended supply chain management program from graduates of its MicroMasters program, reducing its usual 10-month program to 5 months. This pilot also saw 200,000 people signing up, 19,000 earning certificates and 800 sitting for the final proctored examination. It was reported in July 2018 that the students who were admitted into the blended program had better than average scores across the board than those who were in the residential program.

=== Funding ===
In October 2016, the Lumina Foundation granted $900,000 to edX to create 30 more MicroMasters certificate programs.

== Program structure ==
=== Prerequisites ===
All MicroMasters programs are currently running on the edX MOOC platform, where learners are free to audit any of the courses and pay later should they choose to do so. Depending on the program, there are prerequisites ranging from graduate level understanding of various specific disciplines or work experienced. However, these prerequisites serve as recommended guidelines for the learners rather than a strictly enforced rule so there are no specific degree requirements for any of the courses. However, learners will have to pay if they wish to pursue a verified certificate.

=== Certification ===
To qualify for a certificate for successfully completing a MicroMasters program, all learners are required to complete a series of interactive courses as specified in the respective MicroMasters program and achieve a minimum grade according to the institution awarding the certification.

=== Continuing education ===
For learners interested in academic credit, the learner must be admitted into the university's respective master's program. Some programs, such as the MicroMasters Program in Supply Chain Management by MIT also operate on a blended learning model which include a timed examination as well as a final proctored examination. Admission requirements for its on-campus blended learning program differ from its traditional residential admission requirements as applicants are not required to submit scores in a GRE or GMAT as performance in the Micromasters program will be taken as a substitute for it. Some other programs still follow usual admission guidelines and the MicroMasters program has little to no impact on their application apart from receiving advanced credits upon admission into its respective programs. Generally, most courses include practice exercises which are ungraded as well as graded assignments with limited attempts.

The following is a list of the current MicroMasters programs offered as well as the respective graduate degree options available for each program upon graduation of the MicroMasters program.

MicroMasters program name	Institution	Institutions offering credit for advanced standing	Subsequent degree options with advanced standing	Program endorsements
Accounting	Indiana University	Indiana University	MS in Accounting	PwC
Accounting and Financial Management	UMUC, University System of Maryland	UMUC	MS in Accounting and Financial Management	Xero Americas
Algorithms and Data Structures	University of California, San Diego	Rochester Institute of Technology	MS in Professional Studies	Yandex
Analytics: Essential Tools and Methods	Georgia Institute of Technology	Georgia Institute of Technology	MS in Analytics	Equifax, Tech Mahindra
Artificial Intelligence	Columbia University	Columbia University	Master of Computer Science	General Electric
Big Data	University of Adelaide	University of Adelaide	Master of Data Science	PwC
Chemistry and Technology for Sustainability	Wageningen University & Research	Wageningen University & Research	MSc in Biobased Sciences	AzkoNobel
Bioinformatics	UMUC, University System of Maryland	UMUC	Master of Biotechnology	GeneDx
Business Analytics	Columbia University	Columbia University	MS in Management Science & Engineering, MS in Marketing Science, MS in Business Analytics	Bloomberg
Business and Operations for a Circular Bio-Economy	Wageningen University & Research	Wageningen University & Research	MSc in Biobased Sciences	Croda
Business Fundamentals	University of British Columbia	University of British Columbia	Master of Management	Hootsuite
Business Leadership	The University of Queensland	The University of Queensland	Master of Business	Woollam Constructions, Virgin Australia
Business Management	Indian Institute of Management Bangalore	Indian Institute of Management Bangalore	Advanced Management Program	Oracle Consulting
Certified Lifestyle Medicine Executive	Doane University	Doane University	MBA	Avera
Cloud Computing	UMUC, University System of Maryland	UMUC	Masters in Cloud Computing Architecture	Booz Allen Hamilton, Lockheed Martin
Corporate Innovation	The University of Queensland	The University of Queensland	Masters Entrepreneurship and Innovation	EY
Cybersecurity	Rochester Institute of Technology	Rochester Institute of Technology	MSc in Computing Security	IBM, Tech Mahindra
Data Science	University of California, San Diego	Curtin University, Rochester Institute of Technology	MSc in Data Science, Master of Predictive Analytics	Mitchell International, Tech Mahindra
Design Thinking	Rochester Institute of Technology	Rochester Institute of Technology	MS in Professional Studies	Autodesk
Digital Leadership	Boston University	Boston University	MS in Digital Innovation	Fidelity, Tech Mahindra
Digital Product Management	Boston University	Boston University	MS in Digital Innovation	Fidelity
Economics and Policies for a Circular Bio-Economy	Wageningen University	Wageningen University	MSc in Biobased Sciences	Croda
Emerging Automotive Technologies	Chalmers University of Technology	Chalmers University of Technology	MSc in Automotive Engineering, MSc in Systems, Control and Mechatronics	Volvo, Zenuity
Entrepreneurship	Indian Institute of Management Bangalore	Indian Institute of Management Bangalore		Infosys
Finance	MIT Sloan School of Management	MIT Sloan School of Management	Master of Finance	Goldman Sachs
Global Business Leadership and Management	Arizona State University	Arizona State University	Master of Applied Leadership & Management, Master of Global Management	YDM
Healthcare Administration	Doane University	Doane University	MBA	Schoolcraft Memorial Hospital
Human Rights	Curtin University	Curtin University	Master of Human Rights	Amnesty International
Information Systems	Indiana University	Indiana University	Master of Science in Information Systems	EY
Integrated Digital Media	New York University	New York University, Rochester Institute of Technology	M.S. in Integrated Digital Media, Master of Science in Professional Studies	Microsoft
International Hospitality Management	The Hong Kong Polytechnic University	The Hong Kong Polytechnic University	MSc in International Hospitality Management	The Dragon Hotel, Hotel ICON
International Law	Université catholique de Louvain	Université catholique de Louvain	LL.M. in International Law, Online LLM in International Law	Foley Hoag
Internet of Things	Curtin University	Curtin University	Master of International Business and Entrepreneurship, Master of Engineering Science (Electrical Engineering)	Cisco, Tech Mahindra
Instructional Design and Technology	UMUC, University System of Maryland	UMUC	Masters in Learning Design and Technology	Discovery Education
Leadership in Global Development	The University of Queensland	The University of Queensland	Master of Leadership in Global Development	AECOM, Overseas Development Institute
Leading Educational Innovation and Improvement	The University of Michigan	The University of Michigan	Master in Educational Leadership and Policy, Master in Teaching and Learning, Master in New Media and Literacy, Master in Urban Pedagogy	Carnegie Foundation
Management	Université catholique de Louvain	Université catholique de Louvain	Master of Management	Volvo
Managing Technology & Innovation	RWTH Aachen University	RWTH Aachen University	MSc in Management and Engineering in Technology, Innovation, Marketing and Entrepreneurship	Ford, Tech Mahindra
Marketing Analytics	University of California, Berkeley	Curtin University	Master of Marketing	On Demand Advisors
Marketing in a Digital World	Curtin University	Curtin University	Master of Marketing	Marketforce
MBA Core Curriculum	University System of Maryland, The University of Maryland, College Park	The University of Maryland, College Park	MBA	Northrop Grumman
Nano-Science and Technology	Purdue University	Purdue University	MS in Electrical and Computer Engineering	Qualcomm, Rolls-Royce
Predictive Analytics for Business Applications	University of Edinburgh	University of Edinburgh	MSc in Business Analytics	PwC
Principles of Manufacturing	Massachusetts Institute of Technology	Massachusetts Institute of Technology, Rochester Institute of Technology, RMIT University, Chulalongkorn University	MEng in Advanced Manufacturing and Design, Master of Engineering Management, MS in Professional Studies, MBA	
Project Management	Rochester Institute of Technology	Rochester Institute of Technology	MS in Professional Studies	Paychex
Robotics	University of Pennsylvania	University of Pennsylvania	MSE in Robotics	Rethink Robotics
Social Work: Practice, Policy and Research	The University of Michigan	University of Michigan	Master in Social Work	National Council for Behavioral Health
Software Development	University of British Columbia	Curtin University	MSc in Computer Science	Hootsuite
Software Testing and Verification	UMUC, University System of Maryland	UMUC	Master in Information Technology	Booz Allen Hamilton
Solar Energy Engineering	Delft University of Technology	Delft University of Technology	MSc in Sustainable Energy Technology, MSc in Electrical Engineering	Trina Solar
Statistics and Data Science	Massachusetts Institute of Technology	Chulalongkorn University, Covenant University, Curtin University, Deakin University, Doane University, Galileo University, Harvard Extension School, Holy Spirit University of Kaslik, Massachusetts College of Pharmacy and Health Sciences, Massachusetts Institute of Technology, Reykjavik University, RMIT University, Rochester Institute of Technology, Royal Roads University, Southern New Hampshire University, Tsinghua University, Universidad Technologica	PhD in Social and Engineering Systems, MS in Professional Studies, MBA, MBA in Healthcare Management, Master of Predictive Analytics, Master of Business Analytics, Master of Health Economics, Master of Information Systems, Master of Public Health, Master of Data Analytics, Master of Cyber Security Professional, Master of Nutrition and Population Health, Master of Information Technology, Master of Data Science, Master of Business Management, MSc in Business Management, Master of Information Management, MSc in Information Management	Booz Allen Hamilton
Supply Chain Management	Massachusetts Institute of Technology	Arizona State University, Covenant University, Curtin University, Deakin University, Doane University, Duale Hochschule Baden-Württemberg, Griffith University, Harvard Extension School, Massachusetts Institute of Technology, Purdue University, Reykjavík University, RMIT University, Rochester Institute of Technology, Royal Roads University, The University of Queensland, Universidade Federal do Rio Grande do Sul, Universidad Galileo, University of Zaragoza	MEng in Supply Chain Management, MBA, Master in Operations Management, Master of Commerce, Master of Information Management, Master of Liberal Arts in Extension Studies, M.Sc in Business Management, MSc in Industrial Engineering	Walmart
Sustainable Energy	The University of Queensland	The University of Queensland	Master of Sustainable Energy	Global CCS Institute
Water and Global Human Health	Queen's University	Queen's University	Graduate Diploma in Water and Human Health	Malroz

== Demographics ==
According to a report by Columbia University's Teachers College, a typical MicroMasters student is well-educated and employed, with almost 80% having an undergraduate degree or better. The majority of the learners are between the age of 22 and 44, with the United States and India forming 16% and 14% of the learners, followed by Brazil, Colombia, and Nigeria forming the next 3%. The majority of learners have also shown fluency or proficiency in English.
