= RFID Journal =

Media company

RFID Journal is an independent media company devoted solely to radio frequency identification (RFID) and its business applications. A bi-monthly print publication and online news and information source, the journal offers news, features that address key adoption issues, case studies, and white papers written by academics and industry insiders on different aspects of RFID technology. The Web site includes an FAQs section, organized by topic, bulletin boards, a blog, an RFID event calendar, a searchable vendor directory, a career center, and a store where visitors can purchase reports by RFID Journal and others.

== Digital magazine ==
RFID Journal's digital magazine is published six times a year. It focuses on high-level strategic issues. Topics include building a business case, achieving a return on investment by working with business partners, off-setting the cost of RFID mandates with internal savings, and aligning an RFID deployment strategy with a company's overall business strategy.

Launched on March 1, 2002, RFID Journal, LLC, is a privately held corporation headquartered in Melville, N.Y. RFID Journal is edited by Mark Roberti. .

== Online edition ==
The RFID Journal Web site provides news about RFID. The focus is on the latest deployments, mandates, standards development, and product innovation. Premium content includes features, case studies, best practices, and how-to that explain the technology's capabilities and how it is being used by companies.

== Conferences ==
RFID Journal organizes international educational conferences where end users present case studies about how they are using RFID technology.

== Courses ==
RFID Journal University organizes courses on RFID and Electronic Product Code technologies.
