= Elgar Fleisch =

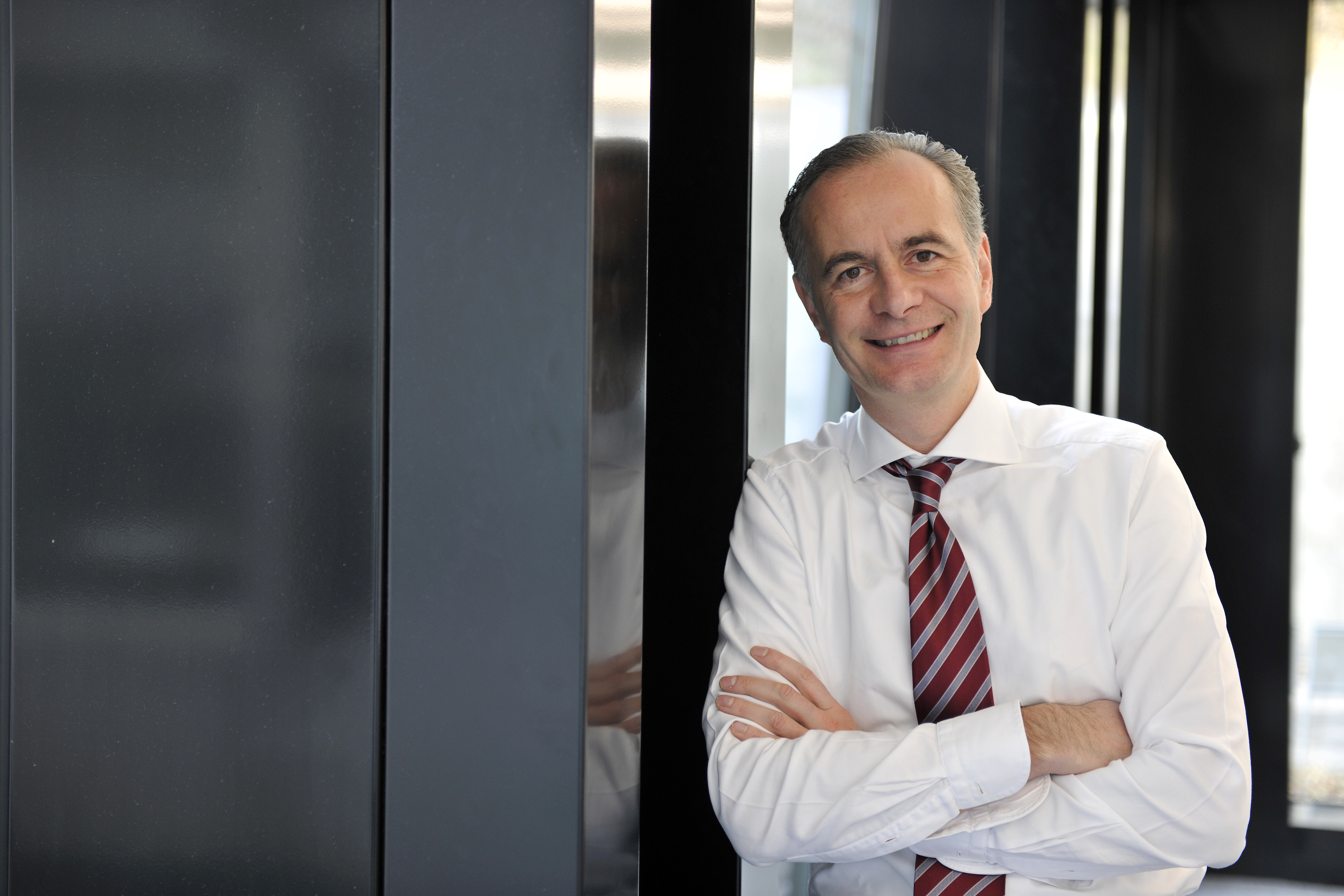
Elgar Fleisch (2013)

Elgar Fleisch (born January 22, 1968, in Bregenz, Austria) is an Austrian/Swiss Professor of Information and Technology Management at ETH Zurich and the University of St. Gallen. Besides his academic career, Elgar Fleisch is also locally known as a singer, songwriter and musician. He is part of the duo Fleisch & Fleisch and has recorded nine albums together with his brother Gerald.

== Biography ==
Elgar Fleisch graduated 1987 in mechanical engineering at the HTL Bregenz, studied information systems at the University of Vienna, and received his PhD in 1993 in Machine Learning. In 1994 he completed his postdoctoral studies at the Institute of Information Management at the University of St. Gallen (HSG) on enterprise networks.

In 1996 Elgar Fleisch interrupted his postdoctoral research for one year and founded IMG Americas. In 2000, he became assistant professor at the University of St. Gallen. Since 2002 Elgar has been full professor at the Institute of Technology Management at the University of St. Gallen (ITEM-HSG). In 2004 he was also appointed to ETH Zurich, where he holds the Chair of Information Management at the Department of Management, Technology and Economics.

Elgar Fleisch spent his sabbaticals at the Massachusetts Institute of Technology and at Dartmouth College. He is a co-founder of several spin-off and start-up companies as well as a member of the supervisory boards of Robert Bosch GmbH, Stuttgart, Germany, Mobiliar Versicherungsgesellschaft AG, Bern, Switzerland and UNIQA Insurance Group AG, Vienna, Austria. Prof. Fleisch is also a member of the Board of Trustees of the Gebert Rüf Foundation, Basel.

== Research ==
Since 1999, Prof. Fleisch's research interest focused on the merger of the physical and digital worlds to an Internet of Things. Together with his team, he pursues the goal of understanding this fusion with a specific focus on technology, applications and implications. In addition, he aims to develop new Internet of Things technologies and applications for the benefit of the economy and society.

Prof. Fleisch has organized his research into several research laboratories, each spanning both universities and combining technology and social sciences. Most projects take place in close cooperation with industry. Elgar Fleisch and his team have published their results in over 500 scientific papers.

== Publications ==
- ResearchGate: https://www.researchgate.net/profile/Elgar_Fleisch
- Google Scholar: https://scholar.google.com/citations?hl=de&user=9CEJKM4AAAAJ
