= EdX =

Online education provider

edX LLC
- Logo
- Website type: Online education
- Available in: Multilingual (14)
- Creators: Massachusetts Institute of Technology and Harvard University
- Industry: E-learning
- Parent: 2U
- Website: www.edx.org
- Commercial: Yes
- Registration: Required
- Users: 83 million (2023)
- Launched: May 2012; 14 years ago
- Current status: Active

edX LLC is an American for-profit massive open online course provider. It was founded by MIT and Harvard. It is a subsidiary of 2U.

== History ==
External audio
- Interview with edX President Anant Agarwal [17:47] on the first anniversary of edX, Degree of Freedom

edX was founded in May 2012 by MIT and Harvard, based on the MITx initiative, created by Piotr Mitros, Rafael Reif, and Anant Agarwal in 2011 at MIT. Gerry Sussman, Anant Agarwal, Chris Terman, and Piotr Mitros taught the first edX course on circuits and electronics from MIT, drawing 155,000 students from 162 countries. In 2013, they partnered with Stanford and in June 2013 they reached 1 million students. edx.org released as open source, creating Open edX.

In September 2014, edX announced a high school initiative. The following month, edX announced professional development courses, and in March 2015 it partnered with Microsoft.

In April 2015, edX partnered with Arizona State University to launch the Global Freshman Academy.

In September 2016, edX launched 19 MicroMasters programs. It launched an additional 16 MicroMasters programs the next year.

In January 2018, edX partnered with Microsoft and General Electric to provide subsidized online courses and guaranteed job interviews. That same month, Tech Mahindra partnered with edX to re-skill workforce on new tech areas. Later that year, edX introduced nine Master's degrees on the platform. The degree programs can be completed fully online and are offered by universities such as Georgia Institute of Technology and University of California San Diego.

On January 10, 2020, edX launched two MicroBachelors programs. The programs offer undergraduate level courses which can lead to university credit for degree seeking students.

=== Subsidiary of 2U (2021-present) ===
On June 29, 2021, edX and 2U announced they had entered into a definitive agreement to merge. 2U would acquire edX's assets for $800M in cash. On November 16, 2021, 2U completed its acquisition of the edX business and website from the nonprofit organization.

According to Anant Agarwal, when 2U acquired edX, it “made a legally binding commitment to preserve and advance edX’s founding mission..." Jefferson D. Pooley, a Muhlenberg University professor and Harvard graduate said “The whole sale itself was a betrayal and a fundamentally misguided choice by Harvard and MIT to betray, in my view, the trust that faculty and students put into it when they signed onto the platform.”

In November 2023, 2U found itself in financial peril. On July 25, 2024, 2U filed for Chapter 11 bankruptcy protection. The company plans to continue operating as a private company which will eliminate over $450 million of its debt.

Fast Company named edX one of its "Most Innovative Companies" for 2024.

== Functionality ==
edX courses consist of weekly learning sequences. Each learning sequence is composed of short videos interspersed with interactive learning exercises, where students can immediately practice the concepts from the videos. The courses often include tutorial videos that are similar to small on-campus discussion groups, an online textbook, and an online discussion forum where students can post and review questions and comments to each other and teaching assistants. Where applicable, online laboratories are incorporated into the course. For example, in edX's first MOOC—a circuits and electronics course—students built virtual circuits in an online lab.

edX offers certificates of successful completion and some courses are credit-eligible. Whether or not a college or university offers credit for an online course is within the sole discretion of the school. edX offers a variety of ways to take courses, including verified courses where students have the option to audit the course (no cost) or to work toward an edX Verified Certificate (fees vary by course). edX also offers XSeries Certificates for completion of a bundled set of two to seven verified courses in a single subject (cost varies depending on the courses).

As of 2016, more than 150 schools, nonprofit organizations, and corporations offered or plan to offer courses on edX. As of July 2020, there were 3,000 courses available for its 33 million registered students.

== Research ==
In addition to educational offerings, edX is used for research into learning and distance education by collecting learners' clicks and analyzing the data, as well as collecting demographics from each registrant. A team of researchers at Harvard and MIT, led by David Pritchard and Lori Breslow, released their initial findings in 2013. EdX member schools and organizations also conduct their own research using data collected from their courses. Research focuses on improving retention, course completion and learning outcomes in traditional campus courses and online.

edX has engaged in a number of partnerships with educational institutions in the United States, China, Mongolia, Japan, and more to use edX courses in "blended classrooms". In blended learning models, traditional classes include an online interactive component. San Jose State University (SJSU) partnered with edX to offer 6.00xL Introduction to Computer Science and Programming, as a blended course at SJSU and released an initial report on the project in February 2013. Initial results showed a decrease in failure rates from previous semesters. The percentage of students required to retake the course dropped from 41% under the traditional format to 9% for those taking the edX blended course. In Spring 2013, Bunker Hill Community College and Massachusetts Bay Community College implemented a SPOC, or small private online course. The colleges incorporated an MIT-developed Python programming course on edX into their campus-based courses, and reported positive results.

== Open edX platform ==
Open edX platform is the open-source platform software developed by edX and made freely available to other institutions of higher learning that want to make similar offerings. On June 1, 2013, edX open sourced its entire platform. The source code can be found on GitHub. The platform was originally developed by Piotr Mitros in 2011, with maintenance transferred to edX in 2012.

== Participating institutions ==
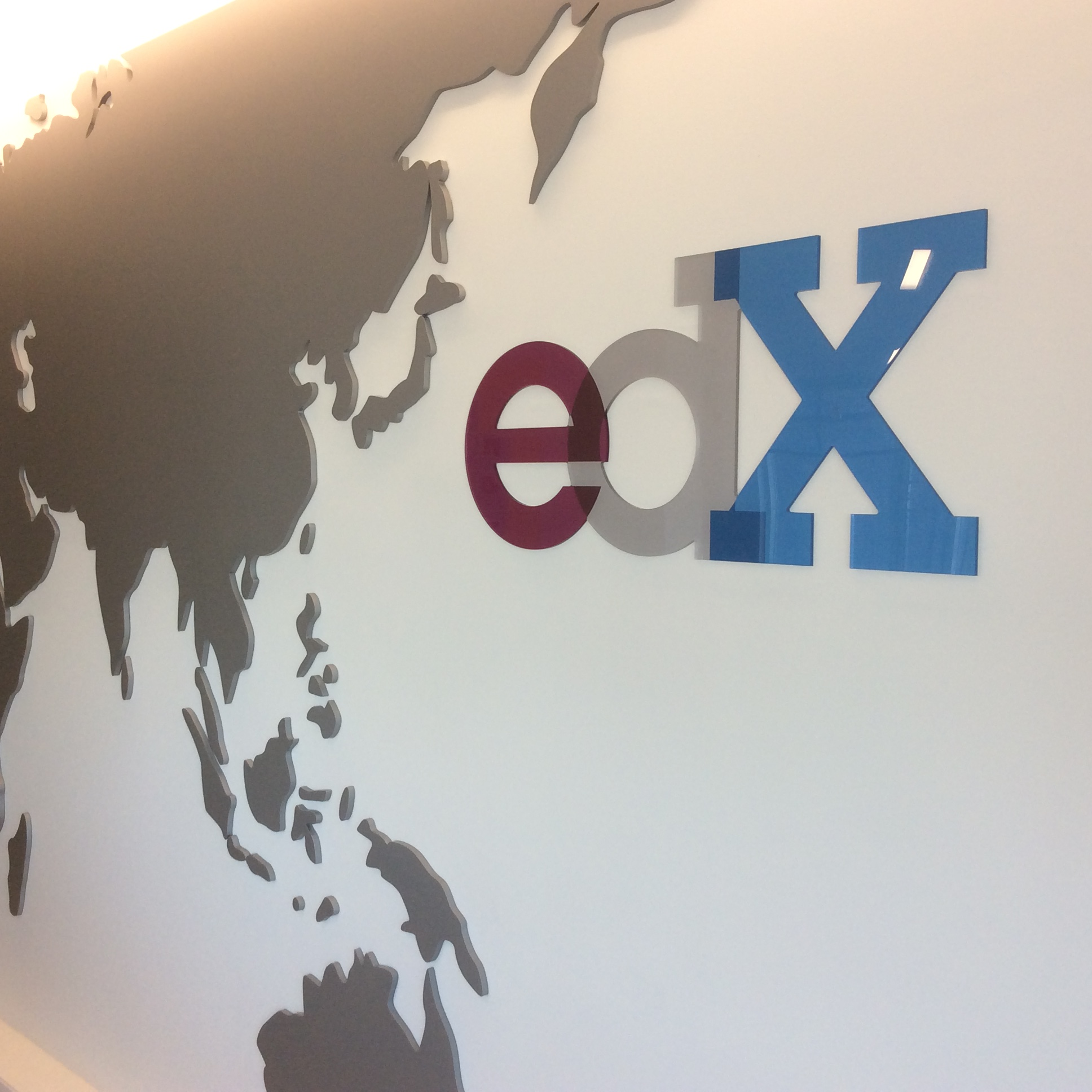
Entrance to EdX HQ in Cambridge, Massachusetts, before it was privatized

In late 2013, several countries and private entities announced their adoption of the edX open source platform to launch new initiatives. Ten Chinese universities joined to form an online education initiative in China, called XuetangX. 120 higher education institutions in France joined under the direction of the French Ministry of Education to offer online courses throughout France, the Queen Rania Foundation for Education and Development (QRF) created Edraak as the first MOOC portal for the Arab world, the International Monetary Fund is using the edX platform to pilot online training courses in economics and finance, and Tenaris corporation is using the platform to expand its corporate training and education for its employees.

As of March 2021, edX had more than 150 partners, including universities, for-profit organizations and NGOs.

== See also ==
- FutureLearn
- Khan Academy
- LinkedIn Learning
- Pluralsight
- Coursera
- Udemy
- Udacity
