= Frederic T. Chong =

American computer scientist and professor

Frederic (Fred) T. Chong
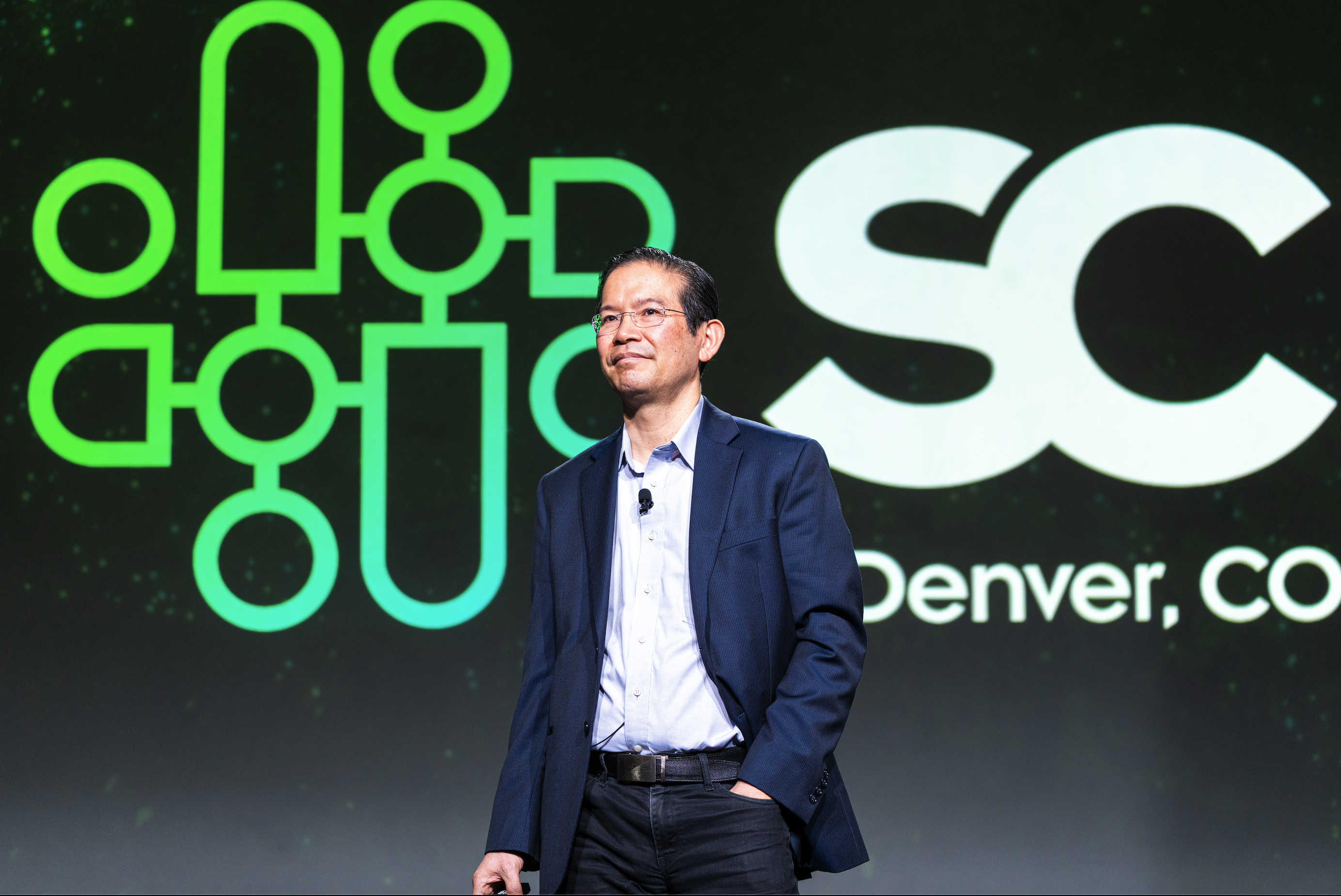
- Fred Chong speaking at SC23
- Born: New Brunswick, New Jersey, US
- Education: Massachusetts Institute of Technology
- Known for: Computer Architecture, Quantum Computing, Computer Security
- Awards: ACM Fellow (2024); Quantrell Award (2024); IEEE Fellow (2023); UChicago Graduate Teaching and Mentoring Award (2020); Intel Outstanding Researcher Award (2018); ACM Distinguished Member (2013); Chancellor's Fellow at UC Davis (2002-2007)
- Scientific career
- Fields: Computer Science
- Workplaces: University of Chicago
- Doctoral advisor: Anant Agarwal
- Website: people.cs.uchicago.edu/~ftchong/

Frederic (Fred) T. Chong is an American computer scientist known for research in computer architecture, quantum computing, and computer security.

Born in New Brunswick, New Jersey, Chong received a BS in Electrical Engineering and Computer Science from MIT in 1990 and a PhD in Electrical Engineering and Computer Science from MIT in 1996, with Prof. Anant Agarwal as his thesis adviser.

Chong had faculty positions at University of California, Davis and University of California, Santa Barbara before joining the University of Chicago faculty in 2015 as the Seymour Goodman Professor of Computer Architecture. He was the lead PI of EPiQC, an NSF Expeditions in Computing program on Quantum Computing. He is a Fellow of the ACM and the IEEE.

In 2020, Chong co-founded Super.tech and was Chief Scientist for the quantum software company. In 2022, Super.tech was acquired by Infleqtion (formerly ColdQuanta), and Chong is Chief Scientist for Quantum Software.

== Awards ==
- 2024: Named Fellow of the ACM "for contributions to quantum computer architecture, compilation and optimization".
- 2024: Received the Quantrell Award for Undergraduate Teaching and Advising from the University of Chicago, the oldest undergraduate teaching award in the United States.
- 2023: Elevated to Fellow Member of the IEEE "for contributions to the field of quantum computer architecture, compilation and optimization".
- 2020: Received the Award for Excellence in Graduate Teaching and Advising from the University of Chicago.
- 2019: Intel Outstanding Researcher Award.
- 2013: Named an ACM Distinguished Member.
- 2002: University of California, Davis Chancellor's Fellow.
