= Kerry Chen =

Chinese business executive

- 陈雪峰
- Born: Chen Xuefeng; 1980 (age 45–46); Huangshi, Hubei, China
- Occupation: Entrepreneur
- Years active: 2011 – present
- Known for: Founder and CEO of ATRenew

Kerry Chen is a Chinese entrepreneur who is the founder of ATRenew (previously known as AiHuiShou), a company focused on recycling secondhand mobile phones headquartered in Shanghai. He was listed in the Fortune China 40 Under 40 in 2018 and received the Green China Person of the Year 2020-2021 nomination.

== Early life ==
Chen was born in 1980 in Huangshi, a city in the Chinese province of Hubei.

== Career ==
In 2011, he founded AiHuiShou – an online based company specialized in recycling secondhand mobile phones in Changhai. In 2017, Chen began to be noticed as his company grew and was recognized in the second edition of "Top 10 Internet Entrepreneurs in Shanghai" alongside Colin Huang, founder of e-commerce platform Pinduoduo and the co-founder of online food delivery Ele.me, Zhang Xuhao (Mark Zhang). Chen appeared in the 2018 Fortune China 40 Under 40 and was nominated for the Green China Person of the Year 2021.

In September 2022, Chen rebranded AiHuiShou to ATRenew which is an acronym for All Things Renew. ATRenew serves as a parent company overseeing several subsidiaries including PJT Marketplace, AHS Recycle, Paipai Marketplace and its foreign based AHS Device.

== Recognition ==
Chen was listed in the Time100 most influential climate leaders in business 2024.

== Personal life ==
Chen is married. He is an avid mountaineer.

In 2021, he took over 30 executives from his company on an ascent of Mount Siguniang.
