= Alewife (multiprocessor) =

Computer system developed at the Massachusetts Institute of Technology

Alewife was a cache coherent multiprocessor developed in the early 1990s by a group led by Anant Agarwal at the Massachusetts Institute of Technology. It was based on a network of up to 512 processing nodes, each of which used the Sparcle computer architecture, which was formed by modifying a Sun Microsystems SPARC CPU to include the APRIL techniques for fast context switches.

The Alewife project was one of two predecessors cited by the creators of the popular Beowulf cluster multiprocessor.
