= XuetangX =

Online Education company

- Website type: Online education
- Available in: Chinese; English
- Website: xuetangx.com
- Commercial: Yes
- Registration: Required
- Users: 58.8 million (As of April 2020)
- Launched: October 10, 2013; 12 years ago
- Current status: Active

XuetangX is a massive open online course (MOOC) platform. It offers online courses in multiple disciplines and also certificate and degree programs. Launched on October 10, 2013, as the first Chinese MOOC platform, XuetangX was initiated by Tsinghua University and MOE Research Center for Online Education.

As of the end of 2022, XuetangX has offered nearly 6,000 high-quality courses from universities such as Tsinghua University, Peking University, Fudan University, University of Science and Technology of China, and Massachusetts Institute of Technology, covering 13 disciplines.

== History ==
=== 2016 ===
- XuetangX launched Rain Classroom, a smart toolbox for blended learning developed by Tsinghua University and XuetangX.
- XuetangX partnered with the SDG Academy, enabling the SDG Academy to share sustainable development content across China.
- XuetangX and Telefónica Educación Digital present the launch in China of the International Service for the Evaluation of the Spanish Language (SIELE), a system that certifies the degree of mastery of Spanish language by digital means.

=== 2017 ===
- XuetangX, in partnership with University of Lagos in Nigeria, launches LAGOS MOOC, allowing students of Lagos to access to 12 courses from Tsinghua University.
- XuetangX collaborated with Zhengzhou University and launched their first Medical online master's degree in Mainland China.

=== 2018 ===
- In March 2018, XuetangX signed partnership agreement with French national MOOC platform FUN. The two platforms exchange course resources for students in both countries.

=== 2019 ===
- XuetangX released a new version based on a new self-developed frame.

=== 2020 ===
- XuetangX launched its international version on April 20. The international version of XuetangX offers an English-language interface with other languages including Russian, Spanish, French and Japanese.
