= Swappie =

Finnish startup

Swappie Oy
- Type: Private
- Industry: Recycling, sustainable business, e-commerce
- Founded: 2016 in Helsinki, Finland
- Founder: Sami Marttinen; Jiri Heinonen
- Headquarters: Helsinki, Finland
- Area served: Europe
- Key people: Jussi Lystimäki (CEO)
- Products: Refurbished iPhones and iPads
- Revenue: €249 million (2024)
- Number of employees: >700 (2024)
- Website: swappie.com

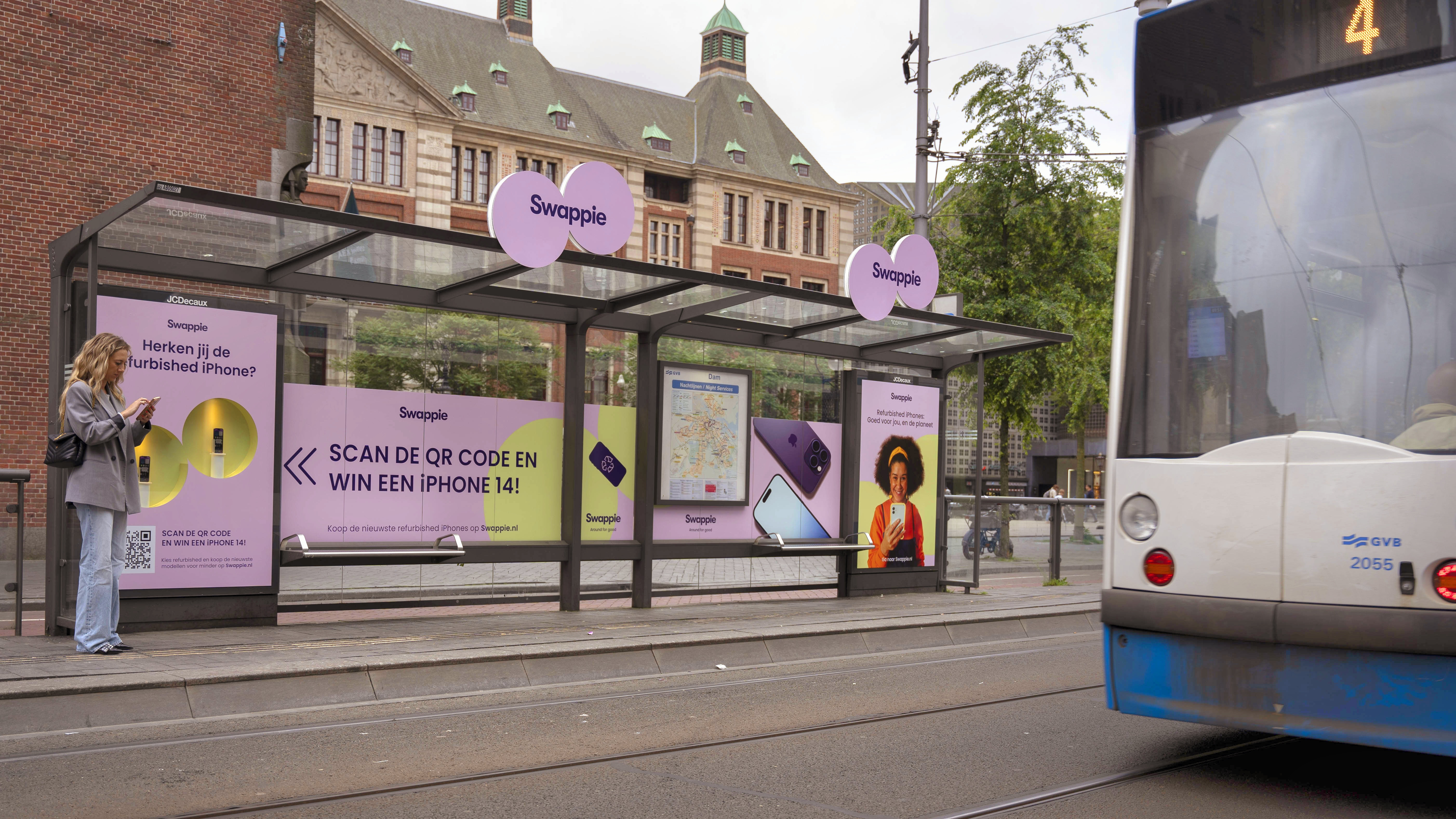
Advertising for Swappie in Amsterdam

Swappie Oy is a Finland-based startup that buys, refurbishes, and resells iPhones and iPads. The company was founded in 2016 and is active across Europe, serving over two million customers as of 2024. Most of Swappie's refurbishment processes are handled in a dedicated operations centre in Tallinn, with a logistics hub in Leipzig, Germany, supporting Central European fulfilment.

== Business model and company structure ==
The company buys, inspects, refurbishes and resells used iPhones and iPads with a warranty of 12 to 36 month. According to CNN, the company is taking up ideas from the right to repair movement in this way.

The used devices are bought directly from end consumers (C2B), Swappie also buys iPhones and iPads from companies (business phones) or from intermediaries (B2B).

The inspection and refurbishing process consists of more than 50 steps. It is carried out in two workshops located in Helsinki and Tallinn (Estonia) respectively. The company headquarters is also located in Helsinki. In 2023 the company downsized the Helsinki workshop, moving most of the refurbishment work to Tallinn, and only leaving complex repairs in Helsinki. The fulfillment for Central Europe is handled in Leipzig, Germany.

== Markets and focus ==
The company is active across Europe, serving customers in more than 15 countries. Finland, Sweden, Italy and Germany are considered the company's largest markets. Competitors differ from country to country. They include, for example Refurbed, Back Market, Mint+, Telia and Apple's own refurbed online store.

Swappie focuses its business on iPhones and iPads.

== History ==
Sami Marttinen and Jiri Heinonen founded the company in 2016, back then under the name Digilean Nordic Oy. The business idea was born after Marttinen fell victim to fraud when buying a used iPhone online. The start-up raised funds from investors in several financing rounds between 2019 and 2022. These investors include Lifeline Ventures, Reaktor Ventures, Inventure, and TESI. The company had refurbished and resold more than 1 million iPhones by 2022. At that time, the number of employees was 1,200 and sales amounted to over 200 million euros. In 2024 the European Investment Bank, i.e. the European Union's investment bank, provided a five-year, €17 million loan. The loan is intended to support process improvements in automation and robotics to make iPhone repairs quick and reliable.

== Awards ==
Swappie has been awarded as the fastest growing company in Europe according to the Financial Times and Statista FT1000 ranking in 2022 and Finland's most successful startup by Deloitte Technology Fast 50 list in 2021.
