= Korea University College of Science =

College in Seoul, South Korea

College of Science
- 고려대학교 이과대학 (高麗大學校 理科大學)
- Type: Private
- Established: 1952
- Dean: Seong-Jae Doh
- Faculty: 63
- Undergraduates: 800
- Postgraduates: 275
- Location: Seoul, South Korea
- Campus: Urban
- Website: science.korea.ac.kr

The College of Science (abbreviated to KUCS) is a division of Korea University in Seoul, South Korea. It was established in December 1952 as the Division of Science within the College of Liberal Arts. The college offers various bachelor, master, and doctorate programs through affiliation with the Graduate School. Its major academic buildings are located on the university's Hana Square, which it shares with the College of Engineering, the College of Life Sciences and Biotechnology, and other colleges. It is widely regarded as one of the finest colleges of science in the country.

== History ==
The College of Science at Korea University, which was founded in 1905, rose in December 1952 from the College of Arts and Sciences, which included the Departments of Math/Physics, Chemistry, and Biology. Since then it has gone through several expansions to reach its current formation of four majors departments in the physical sciences, while the Biology Department has been separated to form its own college. Currently, the college teaches 800 undergraduates, with 63 full-time faculty members.

== Facilities ==
There are nine research institutes within the college. The Korea Basic Science Institute in Seoul was also built on the campus in 1993. In 1996, Chung Ju-yung, former Honorary Chairman of the Hyundai Group, generously donated a building for the College of Science. The Asan Science Building has six floors and a basement with an area of about 20,000 square meters. This building accommodates all four Departments in the College, as well as research laboratories, networked computer systems, multimedia lecture rooms, and other supporting facilities.

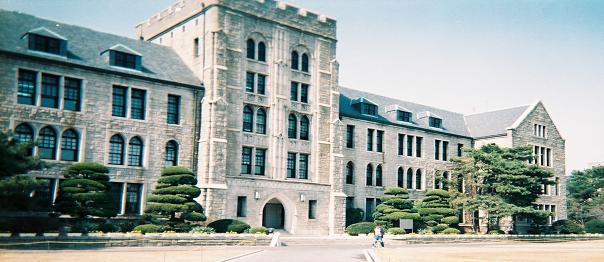
University Hall

== Academics ==
=== Departments ===
The College of Science houses the Mathematics, Physics, Chemistry, and Earth and Environmental Sciences departments. It offers Bachelor of Science degrees. However, students may enroll in the dual-degree program, which allows them to pursue programs of study in two colleges and receive two different degrees.

=== Interdisciplinary programs ===
- Telecommunication Mathematics
- Cryptology
- Science and Technology Studies
- Biophysics and Medical Physics

== Notable alumni and faculty ==
- Chey Tae-Won (B.S., Physics, 1983) - Chairman of SK Group
- Kim Young-Kee (B.S., Physics, 1984) - Professor at the University of Chicago and winner of the Ho-Am Prize in Science in 2005
- Jin Jung-Il - Samsung Professor of Chemistry at KUCS and current President of IUPAC
- Ahn Sung-Ho (B.S., Earth Science) - CEO of Acebed
- Chey Jae-Won (B.S., Physics) - former CEO of SK E&S
- Lee Gwang-Sun (B.S., Physics) - CEO of Hyundai Motor Company
- Kim Keon (B.S., Chemistry, 1974) - Professor of Chemistry at KUCS and current President of the Princeton Club of Korea
