= Hyun In-taek =

South Korean politician (born 1954)

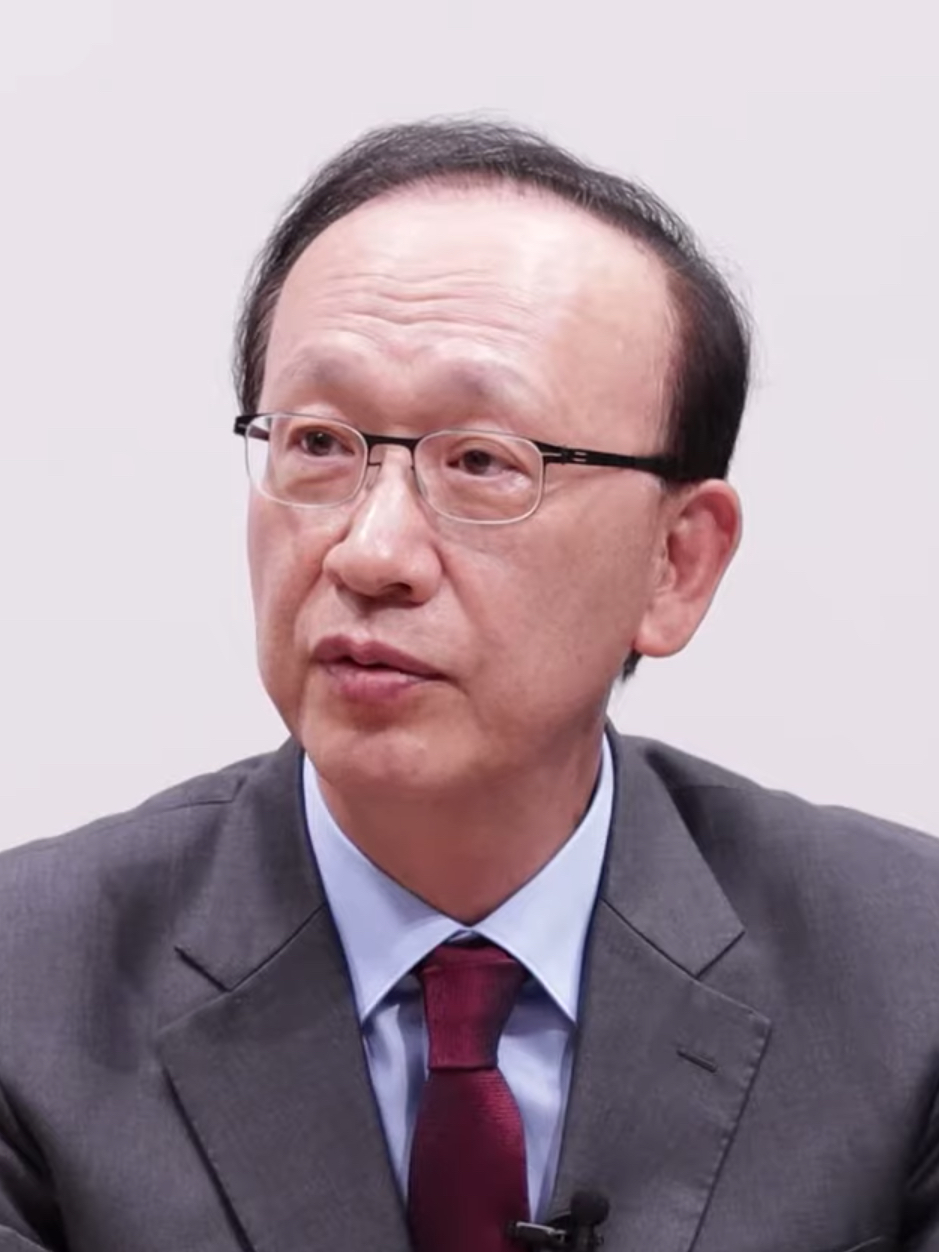
- Hyun in 2020

Korean name
- Hangul: 현인택
- Hanja: 玄仁澤
- RR: Hyeon Intaek
- MR: Hyŏn Int'aek

Hyun In-Taek (Korean: 현인택; born 27 September 1954) is a South Korean politician. He was Minister of Unification of South Korea from January 2009 til August 2011. He was replaced with Yu Woo-ik. As the Minister of Unification, he oversaw matters related to South Korea's policies toward North Korea, inter-Korean affairs, unification of the two Koreas, and public education on unification.

Hyun previously served on the presidential transition committee for President Lee Myung-bak. He was one of the main designers of the Lee Myung-bak administration's policy toward North Korea, "Vision 3000: Denuclearization and Openness" initiative.

Before his appointment as the Minister of Unification, Hyun held a position of professor of political science and international relations at Korea University where he received his B.A. and M.A. He holds a Ph.D. in international politics from the University of California, Los Angeles. He also long served as the director of the Ilmin International Relations Institute, one of Korea's major think tanks on international relations, and was a research fellow at the Sejong Institute, a research institute on security and foreign affairs.
