= Lee Eun-sook =

South Korean breast cancer expert

- 이은숙

President of National Cancer Center
- In office 23 November 2017 – 22 November 2020
- President: Moon Jae-in
- Prime Minister: Chung Sye-kyun
- Minister: Park Neung-hoo
- Preceded by: Lee Kang-hyun
- Succeeded by: Seo Hong-gwan

Personal details
- Born: February 27, 1962 (age 64) Haman County, South Gyeongsang Province, South Korea
- Education: Korea University

Lee Eun-sook (Korean: 이은숙; Hanja: 李銀淑; born 27 February 1962) is a South Korean surgical oncologist with expertise in breast cancer at National Cancer Center (NCC) and previously served as its president from 2017 to 2020. Lee was the first woman to lead the center since its creation in 2000. She was an ex officio president of the NCC Graduate School of Cancer Science and Policy (GCSP) and NCC Foundation's board. She has also served as the secretary-general of Asian National Cancer Centers Alliance from the beginning of her presidency.

She joined the National Cancer Center in 2000 when it was founded and since that time has continued to work at NCC, assuming numerous roles. Since 2011 she has been working as a specialist at NCC's Center for Breast Cancer.

After graduating from Masan Girls' High School as top of her natural sciences class, she went to Korea University College of Medicine where she earned three degrees in medicine from bachelor to Ph.D. Lee built her academic career at University of Texas Houston, Korea University College of Medicine, Northwestern University and NCC. In 1995 she completed a post-doctoral fellowship at Department of Biochemistry and Molecular Biology of University of Texas MD Anderson Cancer Center.

From 1998 to 2000 she was a visiting assistant professor at Robert H. Lurie Comprehensive Cancer Center of Northwestern University. After working as an instructor for approximately five years, she became an assistant professor of surgery at College of Medicine of Korea University in 1996 where she worked until 2000. In 2008 she came back to Korea University and worked as a professor of general surgery at Breast and Endocrine Cancer Branch at its hospital until 2011. In 2014 she became an adjunct professor at NCC's Graduate School of Cancer Science and Policy (GCSP). She taught at its Department of System Cancer Science until 2017 when she moved to Department of Cancer Biomedical Science. She is now the 3rd president of the GCSP.

In November 2017, Lee began her three-year term as the president of the National Cancer Center. In November 2020, her term ended and Lee expressed her willingness to continue to serve in her current position. However, its parent organisation, the Ministry of Health and Welfare, has not announced its decision on the next president of the center.

Lee advised government on multiple occasions as a medical expert. She served as a member of National Cancer Control Planning Board under Ministry of Health and Welfare from 2000 to 2006. In addition, she is an advisor to National Evidence-based Healthcare Collaborating Agency (NECA) from 2015, National Pension Service's Reexamination Committee from 2016 and Korea's University's Cancer Precision Medicine Diagnosis and Treatment Enterprise funded by Ministry of Science and ICT from 2017.

She was previously the first female board member of Korean Surgical Society. She served as its director of administration from 2010 to 2012.

== Awards ==
- President Award for Honor Graduate by Korea University (1993)
- Award for Outstanding Paper by The Korean Society of Medical Ultrasound (1996)
- Award for Contribution by National Cancer Center (2001)
- Doosan Yonkang Academic Awards Surgical Division by Doosan Yonkang Foundation (2011)
- Minister of Health and Welfare Citation Award (2016)
- Roche Cancer Academic Awards by The Korean Cancer Association (2016)

== Published works ==
Lee contributed to six cancer-related books published by NCC in Korean for the public and patients.

She also contributed to more than 160 articles on cancer - mostly breast cancer - published by journals registered at Science Citation Index, Science Citation Index Expanded or Social Sciences Citation Index so far.
