= Korea University College of International Studies =

College in Seoul, South Korea

College of International Studies
- 고려대학교 국제대학
- Type: Private constituent college
- Established: 2002; 24 years ago
- Parent institution: Korea University
- Dean: Jung-Sun Han, Ph.D.
- Total staff: 40
- Students: 400
- Location: Seoul, South Korea; 37.588337°N 127.030881°E
- Campus: Urban
- Website: https://int.korea.edu

Korean name
- Hangul: 고려대학교 국제대학
- RR: Goryeo daehakgyo gukje daehak
- MR: Koryŏ taehakkyo kukche taehak

The College of International Studies (Korean: 고려대학교 국제대학) is a constituent college of Korea University in Seoul, South Korea. It includes three divisions: Division of International Studies, which follows an English track, the Division of Global Korean Studies, which focuses on Korean Studies, and the Global Open Major Division, a liberal arts division which is exclusive to international students.

== History ==
The new Division of International Studies was introduced in 2002 in the course of Korea University launching an internationalisation of their curriculum. It was developed to provide interdisciplinary education in international studies and can therefore accommodate both domestic students and international students.

In 2022, the department was reorganized when Korea University’s Division of International Studies was elevated to an international college-level unit. The change involved the establishment of the Division of Global Korean Studies, an expansion of the existing GKS Convergence Major into a full undergraduate program. The original GKS Convergence Major continues to operate as a convergence major alongside the new department.

In 2024, Korea University established the Global Open Major Division, a division exclusively for international students. It offers Korean and English language tracks, with students required to meet language proficiency standards to enter specific majors. The division admits only international students and allows for a wide range of departmental choices, with fewer restrictions on enrollment numbers compared to other programs.

== Academics ==
The College of International Studies at Korea University includes three divisions: the Division of International Studies (DIS), the Division of Global Korean Studies (DGKS), and the Global Open Major Division (GOMD), each with its own distinct academic programs, faculty, and administrative structure. "Students are able to take all courses and do not need to officially declare a specialization. However, for students doing the Intensive Major it is advisable to specialize in one of the five areas."

=== Division of International Studies ===
The Division of International Studies (DIS) at Korea University was established in 2002 to provide interdisciplinary education in international affairs. The division offers an English-language curriculum and serves both domestic and international students, with approximately one-third of its student body comprising international students. The academic program allows students to concentrate in one of five areas: International Commerce, International Development and Cooperation, International Peace and Security, Area Studies, and Korean Studies.

The curriculum integrates theoretical approaches and applied methodologies in the field of international studies. Students may pursue a double major with other departments at Korea University. The division also encourages participation in internships, Model United Nations, debate clubs, and other extracurricular activities. DIS students have access to a number of affiliated research and policy centers, including the EU Centre, the International Human Rights Center, the Center for Global Climate and Marine Governance, the East Asia Research Center, and the UNDP Seoul Policy Center. These institutions host lectures and seminars featuring speakers from international organizations and academia.

Faculty members at DIS are drawn from different academic backgrounds and many are active in international and domestic policy work, including consulting for governments, international institutions, and NGOs. Faculty research and external engagements are integrated into the academic experience.Graduates from DIS typically pursue careers in government agencies, international organizations, multinational corporations, and non-governmental organizations, or continue with postgraduate studies at domestic and international institutions.

=== Division of Global Korean Studies ===
The Division of Global Korean Studies (DGKS) at Korea University was established in 2022. It offers a Bachelor of Arts degree in Global Korean Studies with a curriculum that combines perspectives from political science, sociology, culture, history, economics, and legal studies. The program emphasizes both regional and global contexts related to Korea. The Division teaches in Korean and English. Its students are from over 100 countries. Faculty are educated from across the globe, and they engage in policy work with government and international organizations. The program also allows students to double major in other departments in the university. Students are encouraged to gain practical experience through internships in different sectors such as government, culture, and private institutions. DGKS students also have access to affiliated research centres like the EU Centre, the International Human Rights Centre, and the UNDP Seoul Policy Center.

=== Global Open Major Division ===
The Division of Global Open Major (GOMD) at Korea University was established in March 2024 as a liberal arts institution exclusively for international students, in which students select their desired major upon the completion of the second semester. During admission, students select either a Korean-language track or an English-language track. Students in the Korean track are required to obtain a TOPIK level 5 or higher after their first year to enter a major. There are no academic grade restrictions or limits on the number of students admitted to each major.

The Korean track allows entry into 43 departments, excluding the Colleges of Medicine, Nursing, Education, International Studies, and certain contracted departments such as Cyber Defense, Semiconductor Engineering, Next-Generation Communications, and Smart Mobility. The English track permits entry into five departments: Business Administration, Mechanical Engineering, Convergence Energy Engineering, Earth and Environmental Sciences, and International Studies.

Admission to the Global Open Major Division is exclusive to international students. Domestic students are not eligible to be admitted. Domestic students that are interested in liberal arts majors are encouraged to apply to the Liberal Arts Department or the new undergraduate college being established in 2025. Beginning in 2025, the Liberal Arts Department eliminated limiting choice in majors and limited caps on enrollment.

== Student councils ==
Korea University's College of International Studies comprises three separate student administrative bodies: the student councils of the Division of International Studies (DIS), the Division of Global Korean Studies (DGKS), and the overarching College of International Studies (CIS). Each council conducts its own election process independently. Student council elections are held annually, either through regular elections in November or, when necessary, through special elections in March. The elected president leads the council for a term of approximately one year and oversees an administrative structure composed of five departments. Each department is managed by appointed members who carry out various functions related to student welfare, event planning, and departmental representation.

=== DIS Student Council ===
The CIS Student Council (Council of International Studies) at the Korea University Division of International Studies has several duties and responsibilities that are committed to promoting student welfare and enhancing student life on campus. They plan events such as information sessions, social events, and assisting students with adjusting to university life. The area of campus is multicultural with the student body being representative of a variety of different cultures. It also helps the integration of both international and local students through inclusive events and activities.

The Council develops partnerships with and supports student-led clubs and societies in the Division. It supports the Korea University International Organizations Student Society (KIOSS), Korea University Debate Club (KUDC), FC KUDIS (a student football club), District 23 (a dance club), and KUDISCHORD (a student music band). Some of these groups provide place for additional academies based and extra-curricular support. The council takes charge in preparing annual school events such as Ipselenti, Ko-Yon-Jeon (the athletic contest of both universities: Korea University and Yonsei University) and endeavors to enhance its students’ general welfare.

=== DGKS Student Council ===
The Student Council of the Division of Global Korean Studies (DGKS) is responsible for a number of administrative and representative tasks regarding an application and service area, which include developing and promoting the department, managing and maintaining budgets and spending, to supporting the educational welfare of students, and many others, as well as associated events. The common interest of promoting each Member's time at the university and developing the cultural integration of a population with a broad diversity of students, welcomed as part of the International students, is highlighted.

As the amount of international students remains significant in number, the council supports inclusivity, socialization, and student rights. Further, plans are in establishment of academic Styles of the divisions, through academic focusing stages, when establishing these with students members of the DGKS. Events are foreseen promoting contemporary topics regarding Korea and what the understanding of Korean culture is through examining, as well as undertaking, cultural links with other, similarly multicultural, countries.

== See also ==
- Korea University Graduate School of International Studies
