= Kil Chung-hee =

South Korean physician (1899–1990)

Kil Chung-Hee
- Born: 3 February 1899; Seoul, Korean Empire
- Died: 1990 (aged 90–91); Cheltenham, Pennsylvania
- Education: Tokyo Women's Medical College (M.D.)
- Spouse(s): Kim, Tak-Won
- Scientific career
- Fields: Medicine
- Workplaces: Chosun Women's Medical Training Institute

Kil Chung-Hee (3 February 1899 – 1990) was a Korean physician who co-founded the Chosun Women's Medical Training Institute, together with her husband and the American physician Rosetta Sherwood Hall.

== Early life and education ==
Kil Chung-Hee was born in Seoul, Korean Empire (now South Korea), on 3 February 1899. Born to Mr. and Mrs. Hyun-Suk Kil she was the 2nd of three children. After her father died in her early teens, she was raised by her paternal grandparents. Her grandfather, Mr. In-Soo Kill encouraged Chung-Hee to get a formal education.

When the Japanese annexed Korea in 1910 and implemented harsh prohibitions to suppress Korean culture and education, she enrolled in the Tokyo Women's Medical College at age 19. While in Japan, she faced strong prejudice from her Japanese classmates and participated in the Declaration of Korean Independence on March 1, 1919. She graduated medical college in 1923, being the 2nd woman to graduate with a medical degree from the Tokyo Women's Medical College.

== Career ==
After returning to Korea, she interned at the Viceroyalty Hospital of Chosun in Seoul and married Kim, Tak-Won, an internal medicine/ neuropsychiatrist specialist, in 1925. They had two daughters and one son together. Kil and her husband separated for three years to pursue further education with her returning to Tokyo and him to Peking, China. Upon their return to Korea, they met an American missionary physician, Rosetta Hall. Dr. Hall has expressed to Kil the dire need for female physicians in Korea, as many women were apprehensive about seeing male doctors and many died due to a lack of medical care. As such, to satisfy the need for female physicians in Korea, Drs. Kil Hall, and Kim founded the Chosun Women's Medical Training Institute in 1928. In its early years, Kil served as associate dean and lecturer in obstetrics/gynecology and pediatrics. After Hall's retirement in 1933, Kim and Kil expanded the offerings so that they were equivalent to those taught in four-year medical schools. To meet the school's financial needs, Drs. Kil and Kim had to aggressively lobby prominent members of the Korean community while facing opposition from both a male-dominated medical field and the ruling Japanese government. Despite their challenges, by 1938, the school had an enrollment of 64 students, had been elevated to college level, and had been renamed the Seoul Women's Medical Training Institute.

However, once the Chosun Women's Medical Training Institute had been established as a college, Kil and Kim were prohibited from being members of the faculty as punishment for their previous anti-Japanese activities. The college was taken over by the Japanese who then disfavored the enrollment of Korean students. Kim died the following year and Kil started her private practice until she retired in 1964. During this time, she served as president of the Korean Women's Medical Association and as chief physician to the Korean Royal Family. She was also an instructor at Ewha Womans University.

== Awards and recognition ==
In 1959, the Korean minister of public health recognized her significant contributions to Korean medical education. In 1960, she was named a dedicated public servant by the City of Seoul, and in 1961 she was acknowledged by the Ewha Womans University as a pioneer in the medical education of women.

== Later life ==
She emigrated in 1979 to be with her daughter and died in Cheltenham, Pennsylvania in 1990.
