= Korea University Graduate School of International Studies =

Coordinates: 37°35′21″N 127°1′56″E

- 고려대학교 국제대학원
- Established: 1991
- Dean: Andrew Eungi Kim, Ph.D.
- Location: Seoul, South Korea
- Website: https://int.korea.edu

Korea University Graduate School of International Studies is a professional graduate school focusing on international affairs with five different tracks.

== History ==
The department of Graduate School of International Studies (GSIS) located at Korea University was established in 1991. The university itself was established in 1905.

== Student body ==
Approximately 50% of the student body is Korean, with the remaining students coming from a variety of countries including China, the U.S., Germany, Uzbekistan, Japan, Palestine, Ecuador, Rwanda, Finland, Bolivia, Ghana, Indonesia, Canada, and Thailand.

The Student Council helps the students daily and organises both social and academic events for them. However, as of July 2019 the members are not compensated for their job unlike their contemporaries in similar institutions in Seoul.

== Academic programs ==
KUGSIS offers a variety of programs in the fields of International Studies and Korean Studies. International Studies is further subdivided into International Commerce, International Development & Cooperation, International Peace & Security, and Area Studies. In addition to these regular programs, KUGSIS offers a number of special programs on the master's level as well as a doctoral program.

The school is a full member of the Association of Professional Schools of International Affairs (APSIA), a group of schools of public policy, public administration, and international studies.

== Research Activity ==
KUGSIS operates the Global Research Institute, EU Centre, and the International Human Rights Center.

== Ranking and Reputation ==
- KUGSIS is a member of the Association of Professional Schools of International Affairs (which includes Harvard, Yale, and the London School of Economics, among other prestigious institutions).
- The Foreign Policy Association has placed KUGSIS among the top 50 international affairs institutions in the world.
- U.S. News & World Report Ranking: #21 in Asia, #157 in the world.
- In 2013, the university was ranked 145th in the world and 19th in Asia by QS World University Rankings.
- In the 2014 QS World University Subject Rankings, the university's politics, economics, chemical engineering, and communications program were each ranked within the top 50 in the world.
- Korea University is among three institutions known as the "S.K.Y. universities". Approximately 46% of high government officials, 50% of major financial institution CEOs, and 60% of law students passing the recent Korean bar examination are SKY alumni.

== See also ==
Korea University Division of International Studies

Korea University
