= Kim Dong-one =

South Korean academic (born 1960)

- 김동원
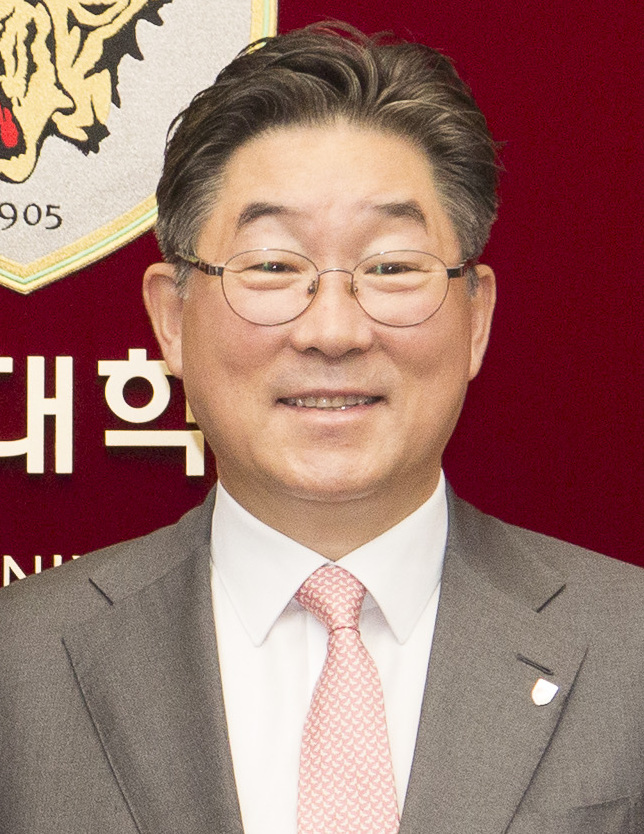
- Kim in 2023

21st President of Korea University
- Incumbent
- Assumed office February 28, 2023
- Preceded by: Chung Jin-taek

Personal details
- Born: January 15, 1960 (age 66) Andong, North Gyeongsang Province, South Korea
- Education: Korea University (BBA); University of Wisconsin-Madison (MBA), (PhD)
- Occupation: Professor, researcher

Korean name
- Hangul: 김동원
- Hanja: 金東元
- RR: Gim Dongwon
- MR: Kim Tongwŏn

Kim Dong-one (Korean: 김동원; born January 15, 1960) is a South Korean professor at Korea University Business School and the 21st president of Korea University. He studied Business Administration at Korea University, and received an MBA and Ph.D. in Management and Human Resources from the University of Wisconsin, Madison. He has been active in research in sociology, and has published many academic papers on business and other subjects.

== Early life and education ==
Kim Dong-one was born on January 15, 1960, in Andong, South Korea. He earned a Bachelor of Business Administration (BBA) from Korea University in 1982, and later pursued graduate studies in the United States, obtaining both a Master of Business Administration (MBA) and a Doctor of Philosophy (Ph.D.) in Management and Human Resources from the University of Wisconsin at Madison in 1991 and 1993 respectively.

== Career ==
Since 1997, Kim has taught full-time at Korea University Business School. Prior to that, he held an international professorship at the State University of New York. At Korea University, he has served in multiple leadership roles, including Dean of the Business School, Dean of the Graduate School of Labor Studies, Vice President for Planning and Budget, and Vice President for General Affairs. He also held positions as Director of the Office of General Affairs and Director of the Office of Planning and Budget.

Internationally, Kim served as President of the International Labor and Employment Relations Association (ILERA), becoming the first Korean and third Asian to hold the position. He has also held advisory roles on the international boards of KEDGE Business School and the University of Manchester. Kim has authored numerous publications on international labor relations and policy, and has served on several Korean government boards and committees.

In 2022, six candidates were nominated by the Presidential Nominations Committee at Korea University. Public hearings were held for each candidate to present and explain their proposals. Following this, a preliminary vote was conducted by a 30-member committee composed of representatives from various divisions of the university. Three finalists emerged from the vote, and Professor Kim Dong-one was ultimately appointed as the 21st president of Korea University by the Board of Directors of the Korea University Foundation. Kim's proposals addressed a wide range of institutional concerns, with a primary focus on stabilizing university finances and guiding Korea University through structural changes. His approach emphasized the need to evaluate intersecting public interests and make strategic decisions about what to preserve, modify, or eliminate in order to ensure sustainable progress. In February 2023, he was inaugurated as the President of Korea University. Kim has also prioritised increasing support and the overall number of international students at Korea University.
