= Centennial Memorial Samsung Hall =

Building in Seoul, South Korea

- Interactive map of the Centennial Memorial Samsung Hall area

General information
- Location: Seoul, South Korea
- Coordinates: 37.58949°N 127.03434°E
- Owner: Korea University

Technical details
- Floor count: 5
- Floor area: 21,000m²

The Centennial Memorial Samsung Hall was completed in commemoration of Korea University's centennial. It houses a digital library and a number of national treasure-level properties of the Korea University Museum. The building was completed on a site of 21,000m².

== See also ==
Korea University Museum
