= Korea University Library System =

Library system of Korea University

Korea University Libraries
- Location: Seoul, South Korea
- Type: Academic library system

Collection
- Size: 2.5 million

Other information
- Website: library.korea.ac.kr

The Korea University Libraries (Korean: 고려대학교 도서관; RR: Golyeodaehaggyo Doseogwan) is the library system of Korea University. With over 2.5 million volumes, it is one of the largest academic library systems in South Korea.

== Libraries in the system ==
- Main Library - Opened in 1978, the Main Library contains about 800,000 pieces of data—the largest collection in any private university library in South Korea.
- Haesong Law Library - the Haesong Law Library boasts the largest collection of any Korean law facility.
- Centennial Digital Library
- Science Library - the Science Library contains about 330,000 books, with a focus on engineering, medicine, and natural science.
- Graduate School Library - built in 1937 to celebrate the 30th anniversary of Bosung College. It has been designated as Historic Site No. 286.

== Library holdings ==
(As of April 1, 2008)

- Print Materials, Non-Books : 2,510,470 vols
- E-Resources : 172,557 titles
