= Korea University Graduate School =

Coordinates: 37.58987°N 127.03322°E

Graduate School
- 고려대학교 대학원 (高麗大學校 大學院)
- Type: Private
- Established: 1949
- Location: Seoul, South Korea
- Website: graduate2.korea.ac.kr

Established in 1949, the Graduate School of Korea University in Seoul, South Korea offers 45 doctoral and 47 master's programs.

== History ==
In 1949, Yoon Sang-hyun, the first president, initiated an expansion of the campus by purchasing the forest and land, and in September of the same year, the graduate school was established.

== Facts ==
- Value of scholarships and ratio of recipients - KRW 18.7 billion, 89.1% of international students (as of 2008)
- Lecture in English - 34% of all lectures (as of 1st semester 2009)
- Number of non-Korean students - 277 (including 188 for Master's level, 74 for Ph.D. level, and 15 for integrated programs)

== Academics ==
- Law
- Business Administration
- International Business
- English Language and Literature
- German Language and Literature
- French Language and Literature
- Chinese & Japanese Language and Literature
- Russian Language and Literature
- Spanish Language and Literature
- Philosophy
- History
- Korean History
- Linguistics
- Psychology
- Sociology
- Comparative Literature and Culture (Interdisciplinary Program)
- Visual Culture (Interdisciplinary Program)
- Classics Translation (Interdisciplinary Program)
- Cultural Heritage Studies (Interdisciplinary Program)
- Food and Resource Economics
- Environmental Science and Ecological Engineering
- Biotechnology
- Political Science and International Relations
- Public Administration
- Economics
- Statistics
- Financial Engineering (Interdisciplinary Program)
- Journalism and Mass Communication
- Mathematics
- Physics
- Chemistry
- Earth and Environmental Sciences
- Science & Technology Studies (Interdisciplinary Program)
- Civil, Environmental and Architectural Engineering
- Architecture
- Mechanical Engineering
- Electrical Engineering
- Materials Science and Engineering
- Industrial Management Engineering
- Mechatronics (Interdisciplinary Program)
- Micro Device Engineering (Interdisciplinary Program)
- Micro/Nano Systems (Interdisciplinary Program)
- Telecommunication System Technology (Interdisciplinary Program)
- Biomicrosystem Engineering (Interdisciplinary Program)
- Medicine
- Biotechnology & Science
- Public Health (Interdisciplinary Program)
- Biostatistics (Interdisciplinary Program)
- Nursing
- Health Science
- Education
- Curriculum and Instruction
- Home Economics
- Korean Language Education
- Physical Education
- Computer Information and Computer Science Education
- English Language Education
- Geography
- Computer and Radio Communications Engineering
- Brain and Cognitive Engineering
- Visual Information Processing (Interdisciplinary Program)
- Bioinformatics (Interdisciplinary Program)
- Social Welfare
- North Korean Studies
- Creative Writing
- Archaeology and Art History
- Applied Linguistics and Culture Studies (Interdisciplinary Program)
- Computer and Information Science
- Applied Physics
- Material Chemistry
- Informational Statistics
- Electronics and Information Engineering
- Environmental Engineering
- Control and Instrumentation Engineering
- Biotechnology and Bioinformatics
- Food Biotechnology
- Sport and Leisure Studies
- Advanced Mechatronic Converging Technology (Interdisciplinary Program)
- Economics and Statistics (Interdisciplinary Program)
- Digital Management
- Center for Advanced Mobile Solutions (Contract Program)
- Nano Semiconductor Engineering (Contract Program)

== Housing ==
Students are responsible for arranging their own accommodations. The University dormitory is one option and also quite affordable, but availability is limited.

- CJ International House
- Anam Hall 2
