= Korea University Museum =

Museum in Seoul, South Korea

Coordinates: 37.5893°N 127.0347°E

- Established: 1934
- Location: Anam, Seongbuk, Seoul, 136-701 South Korea
- Type: History, Archaeology and Art
- Website: University Museum website

Korea University Museum (Korean: 고려대학교박물관), commonly called The University Museum, is a history, archaeology, and art museum of Korea University. It is located in Anam-dong, Seongbuk District, Seoul, South Korea.

The Museum is housed in the Centennial Memorial Samsung Hall that is one of the landmarks of the Korea University campus.
