= The Granite Tower =

English-language magazine in South Korea

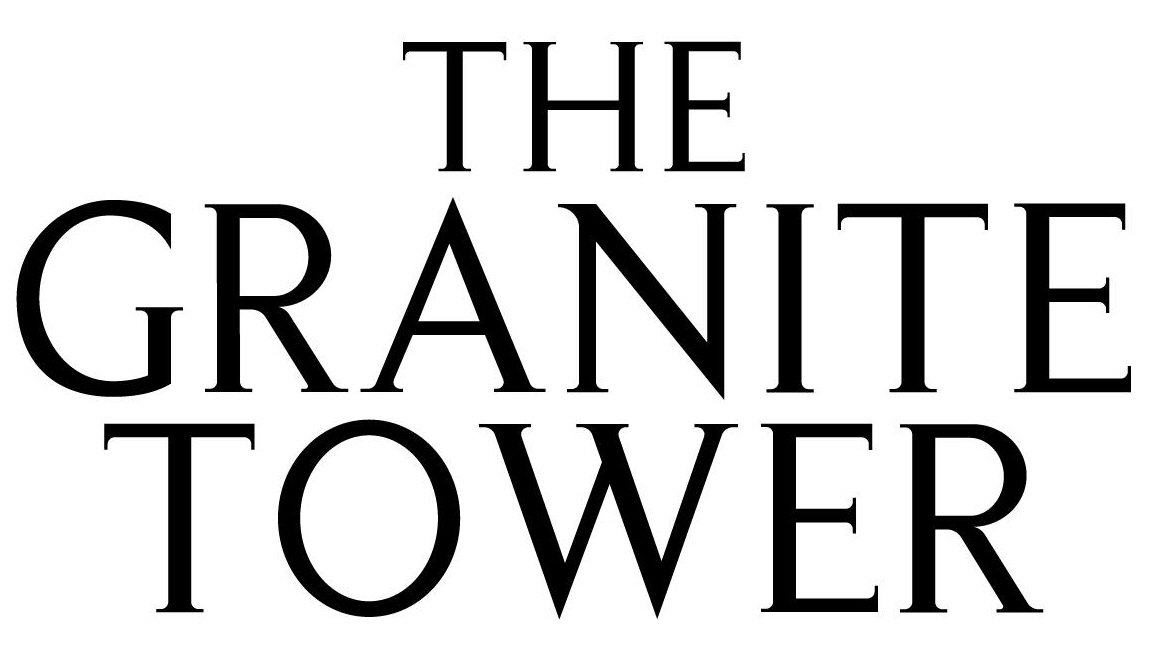
- Categories: Student magazine
- Frequency: Eight times per year
- Founded: 1954 as newspaper 1993 as magazine
- Final issue: 1997 (print)
- Country: South Korea
- Language: English
- Website: http://www.thegranitetower.com/

The Granite Tower is an English language magazine published eight times a year at the start of each semester month by Korea University.

== History ==
The Granite Tower was started by Min Yong-bin, and the first newspaper edition was in September 1954. In 1968, the newspaper was re-established by Park Ik-seo. The Granite Tower became a magazine in 1993 and went online in 1997. The Granite Tower is one of the oldest English language magazine in South Korean universities
