= Ilmin International Relations Institute =

Research center at Korea University

- Formation: 1 April 1995
- Founded at: Seoul, South Korea.
- Dr. Sung-joo Han: Director
- Parent organization: Korea University
- Subsidiaries: Journal of International Politics

Ilmin International Relations Institute (IIRI) is a research institute at Korea University in Seoul, South Korea. Founded in April 1995, IIRI was named after Sang-man Kim, Korea University’s former chairman of the board of trustees. In 1995, Dr. Sung-joo Han was appointed as the first director.

The Institute's first edition of the Journal of International Politics was published in March 1996.

== Research projects ==
- Five-Islands Project
- Korean Strategic Thoughts toward Asia
- US-Korea Alliance and the Future of Northeast Asia (Co-organizer : KEIO Institute of East Asian Studies)
- US-Korea Alliance and the Future of Northeast Asia (Co-organizer : SAIS)
- Globalization, Pluralism, and Securitization in East Asia
- Environmental Security in East Asia
