= Korea University College of Engineering =

South Korean leading private school

College of Engineering
- 고려대학교 공과대학 (高麗大學校 工科大學)
- Type: Private
- Location: Seoul, South Korea
- Website: eng.korea.ac.kr

The College of Engineering is a leading private school for engineering and architecture at Korea University in Seoul, South Korea.

== Departments ==
- Materials Science and Engineering
- Electrical and Electronic Engineering
- Industrial and Management Engineering
- Chemical and Biological Engineering
- Civil, Environmental and Architectural Engineering
- Architecture
- Mechanical Engineering
- Semiconductor Engineering (SK Hynix)
- Communication Engineering (Samsung Electronics)
- Convergence Energy Engineering
