= Korea University College of Life Sciences and Biotechnology =

Korean college

College of Life Sciences and Biotechnology
- 고려대학교 생명과학대학 (高麗大學校 生命科學大學)
- Type: Private
- Academic staff: 90
- Undergraduates: 1,400
- Postgraduates: 450
- Location: Seoul, South Korea
- Website: lifesci.korea.ac.kr

The College of Life Sciences and Biotechnology is the largest BT college in the country with 90 full-time faculty, 1,400 undergraduate students, and 450 graduate students. The College merged the existing College of Life Sciences and College of Life and Environmental Sciences and unified the departmental structures. It restructured and merged the Division of Life Sciences by merging the College of Life Sciences' Departments of Biology, Food Science, and Genetic Engineering, and College of Life and Environmental Sciences' Divisions of Life and Genetic Engineering, Bio Industry Sciences, Food Sciences, and Environmental and Ecology, and the Department of Food and Resources Economics.

== Departments ==
- Life Sciences
- Biotechnology
- Food Science
- Food and Resource Economics
- Environmental Science and Ecological Engineering
