= Korea University =

Private university in Seoul, South Korea

- Former names: Bosung College (1905–1946)
- Motto: Libertas, Justitia, Veritas (Latin) 자유, 정의, 진리
- Motto in English: "Liberty, Justice, Truth"
- Type: Private research university
- Established: 5 May 1905; 121 years ago
- Academic affiliations: APRU, U21
- President: Kim Dong-one
- Faculty: 4,443 (2024)
- Administrative staff: 1,101 (2024)
- Students: 31,130 (2024)
- Undergraduates: 21,029 (2024)
- Postgraduates: 10,101 (2024)
- Location: Seongbuk District, Seoul, South Korea
- Campus: 233.8 acres (94.6 ha); Urban
- Newspapers: Korea University Weekly; The Granite Tower
- Colors: Crimson
- Nickname: Tigers
- Sporting affiliations: U-League
- Mascot: Hwanho (Tiger)
- Website: www.korea.edu

Korean name
- Hangul: 고려대학교
- Hanja: 高麗大學校
- RR: Goryeo daehakgyo
- MR: Koryŏ taehakkyo

Korea University (KU; Korean: 고려대학교) is a private research university in Seoul, South Korea. Korea University also maintains a satellite campus in Sejong City. Established in 1905 as Bosung College by Lee Yong-Ik, a prominent official of the Korean Empire, Korea University is among South Korea's oldest institutions of higher education, and is the nation's first modern private university. It is named after Goguryeo, an ancient Korean kingdom. Korea University is one of the three most prestigious universities in the country, part of a group referred to as SKY universities.

The student body consists of over 28,000 undergraduate students and over 11,000 graduate students. Korea University offers programs in fields such as liberal arts, social sciences, business & economics, and engineering. It has 81 departments in 19 colleges and divisions. It is composed of twenty-two graduate schools as well as eighteen undergraduate schools and colleges. There are eleven auxiliary facilities, including libraries, a museum, and a press office for public relations. It has over 1,500 full-time faculty members with over 95% of them holding Ph.D. or equivalent qualification in their field. The university has produced more than 350,000 graduates, while The Korea University Alumni Association comprises more than 280,000 members.

Korea University's collegiate athletic teams, known as the KU Tigers, compete in the U-League, South Korea's collegiate athletic association, and have been one the most successful programs in college athletics. The university operates multiple athletic clubs and fields teams in sports such as basketball, association football, American football, ice hockey, baseball, and rugby, many of which have origins dating back to the early 20th century. The KU Tiger teams have won multiple national championships across a variety of sports, including basketball, baseball, and association football.

== History ==
=== Bosung College ===
Korea University was established on May 5, 1905, as Bosung College by Lee Yong-Ik, Treasurer of the Royal Household, under the banner “Education Saves the Country,” with a royal grant from Emperor Gojong. Although it was originally intended to include five departments, the college opened with two initial two-year programs in Law and Plutology, under the leadership of its first president, Shin Hae-yeong, former counselor at the Ministry of Finance of the Korean Empire. Classes were held in the former buildings of the National Russian Language School in Bak-dong, which served as its first campus. As an academic institution of nationalistic origin, it was regarded as a symbol of national pride during the colonial period (1910–1945).

In 1907, the programs were extended to three years and renamed the Department of Law and Department of Economy. The college awarded degrees to its first graduates that year. Over the following years, Bosung College expanded its campus by purchasing buildings in Bak-dong and launched academic publications such as "Chinmok" and "Bupjunghagye." In 1910, the institution petitioned to establish new departments, changed its name to Bosung University, and restructured its departments by abolishing Economy and creating Commerce. Control of the college shifted to Chondogyo leadership in late 1910. By 1915, it was renamed Bosung Law and Commerce College and operated only two departments in compliance with regulations by the Japanese Government General.

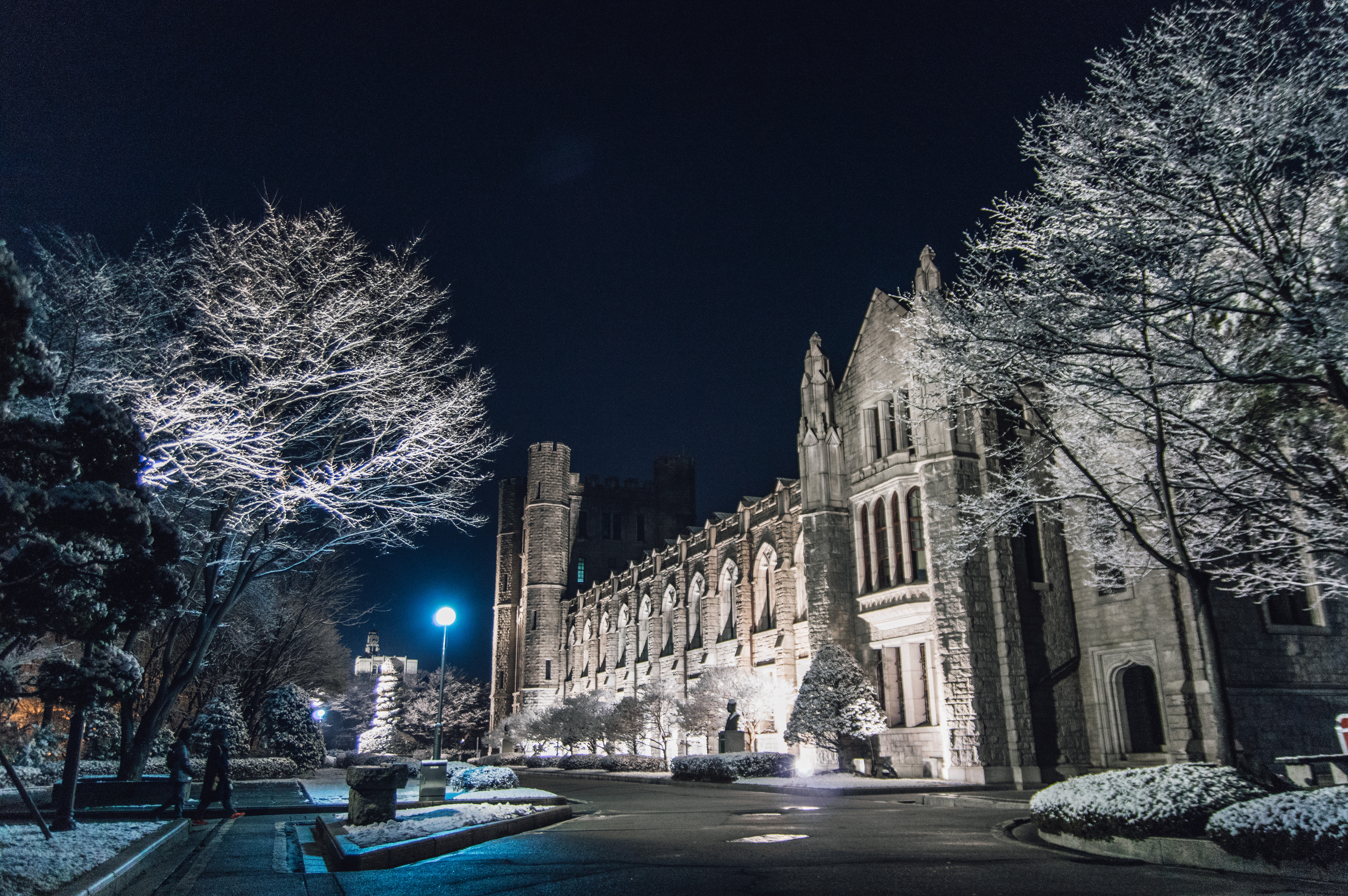
Graduate School Library of Korea University, opened in 1937 to commemorate the 30th anniversary of Korea University

Shortly after Bosung College was established, the "Korea–Japan Protocol" was signed, and Lee Yong-Ik went into exile to lead the resistance movement against Japan. His exile created financial hardship for the institution. The financial crisis was overcome when Sohn Byong-Hee, a leader of Chundokyo, a nationalist, religious, and political movement at the time, took over the management of the institution. By 1929, the institution once again faced a serious financial crisis as a result of the worldwide recession.

The crisis was alleviated when Kim Seong-su became the president of the college in 1932. At the time of acquisition, Kim was managing Choong-Ang High School and The Dong-A Ilbo, a daily newspaper. In 1934, the main building was completed on a 63,000-pyeong area of land located in Anam-dong. Construction of the library started in 1935 to commemorate the thirtieth anniversary of the founding of Bosung College and was completed two years later. In July of the following year, a large athletic field, was added to the campus. In April 1944, the Japanese colonial government forced Bosung College to change its name and placed it under the supervision of the Japanese authorities. Following the legacy of Bosung Professional School, the predecessor institution was placed under the management of a foundation and relocated to a vast area in Anam-dong, where remarkable facilities were established.

=== Post-Independence ===
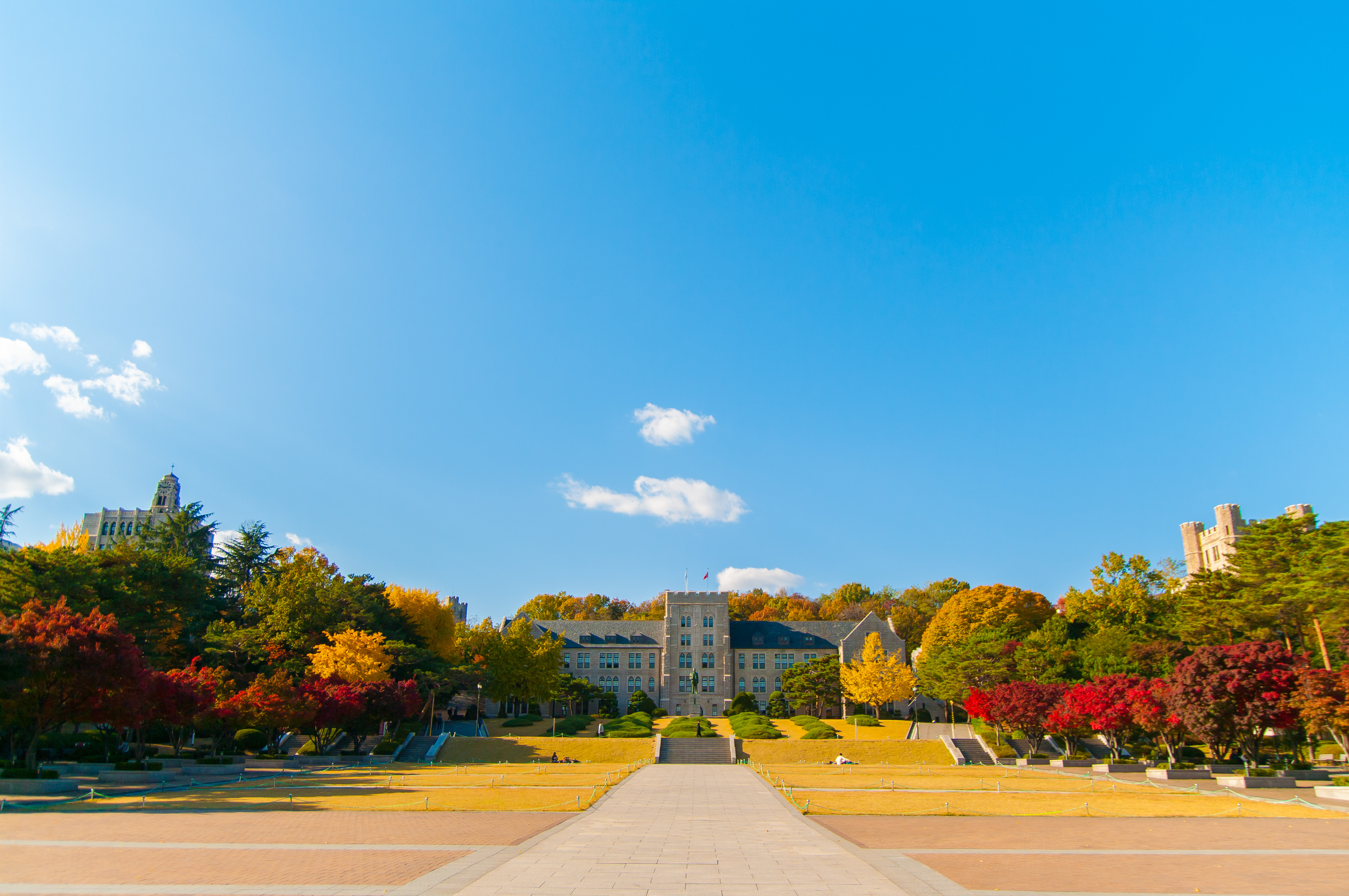
Central Square of Korea University, with the Main Building seen in the distance

Following independence in 1945, Bosung College was elevated to that of a university comprising three colleges, Political Science and Law, Economics and Commerce, and Liberal Arts. The goal was to create a major cradle for nurturing talented individuals and cultivating national culture. Upon liberation from the fervent longing for independence from Japan, in the year 4279 by the traditional Korean calendar (1946), Bosung Professional School was reorganized and elevated to Korea University. Hyun Sang-Yun, the first president, initiated an expansion of the campus by purchasing forest and land. In June 1949, Korea University awarded its first bachelor's degree and in September of the same year, the graduate school was established. Yu Chin-O, the fourth president, continued to expand Korea University with the establishment of the Division of Science within the College of Liberal Arts, as well as a fourth college, the college of Agriculture. After that, Kim Seoung-su, the founder of Korea University, became the Vice President of Government of Korea. This influenced the Korea University's development.

During the Korean War, Korea University temporarily relocated classes to Wondae-dong, Daegu, before returning to Seoul after the armistice. The university expanded its academic departments and facilities, including the construction of Geumnanshil and the auditorium. In the mid-1950s, academic restructuring occurred, and the university grew to serve over 3,300 students. Research institutes such as the UN Resources Library and the Korean Institute for Translating Classics were founded in the late 1950s. Korea University introduced its official flag, emblem, and badge and revived the Friendship Games against Yonsei University. Student life was enhanced with new facilities, and the founder Kim Seoung-su was honored with a statue on campus.

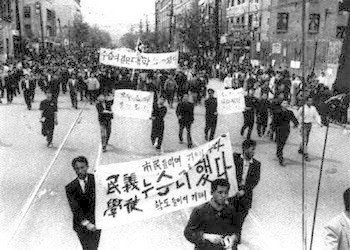
The protest held by Korea University students against the authoritarian rule of Syngman Rhee played a pivotal role in sparking the April Revolution

On April 18, 1960, amid growing public discontent with the authoritarian rule of President Syngman Rhee and the Liberal Party, approximately 3,000 students from Korea University organized a large-scale protest in response to allegations of massive electoral fraud during the March 1960 presidential election. The students gathered on campus, where they read a formal declaration denouncing the government's abuse of power and lack of democratic integrity. They then marched to the National Assembly Building in central Seoul to demand political reform and free elections. As the students went back to campus after the peaceful demonstration, they were confronted by violent pro-government vigilantes, who many believed to have been mobilized by the state. The event contributed to the initiation of the April 19 Revolution the following day when students and citizens across the nation erupted into protests, that ultimately led to Rhee's resignation and the downfall of the First Republic of Korea. Each year, to commemorate the courage and sacrifice of the students involved, the university hosts the 4.18 Marathon, a symbolic run from the university's main gate to the April 19th National Cemetery in Suyu-dong, northern Seoul, where participants pay tribute to the victims of the struggle for democracy. A monument honoring the Korea University students involved in the April 18 protest was built close to the university's main square, as a permanent tribute to their participation and contribution in the democratic movement that resulted in the April 19 Revolution.

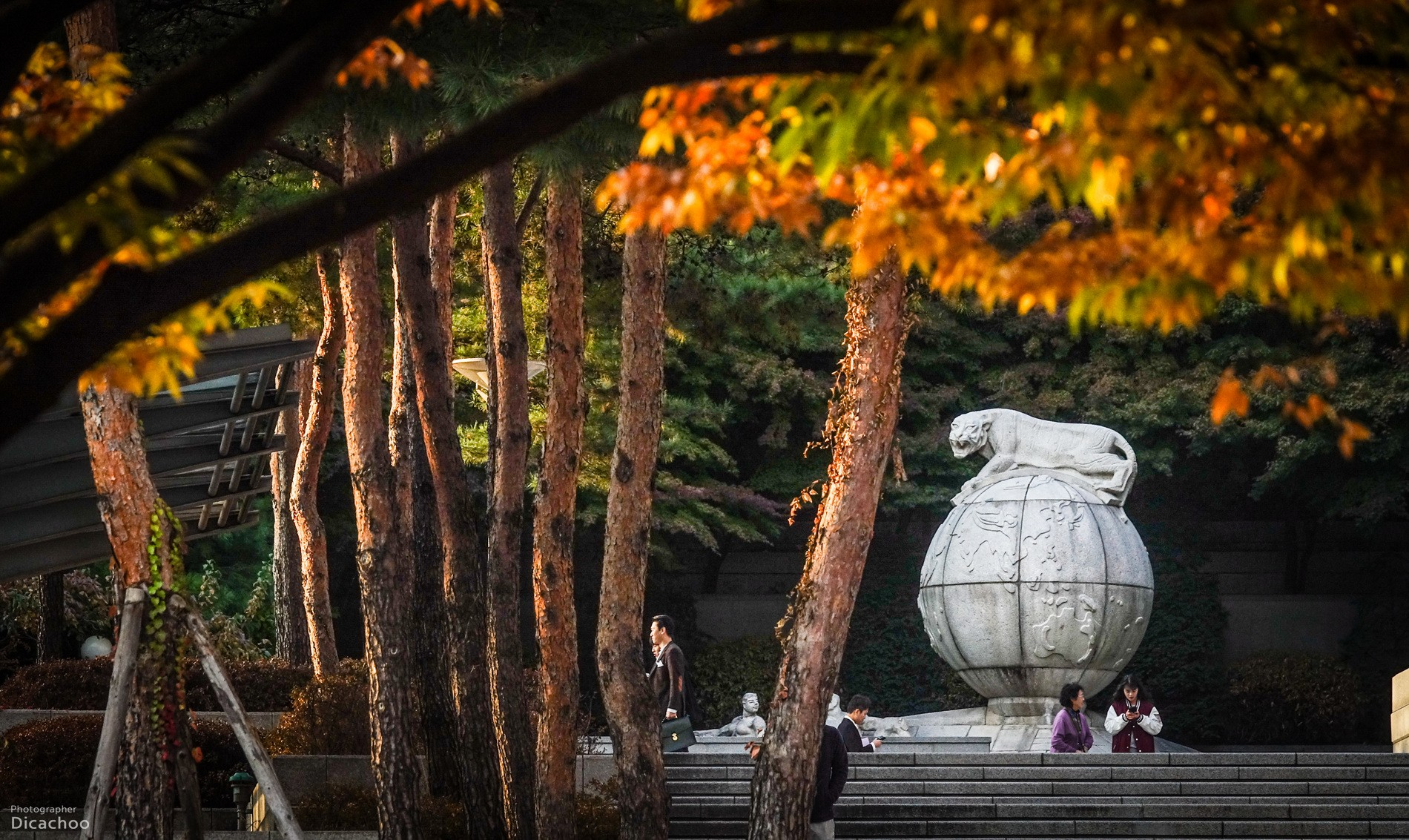
The Tiger Statue, erected in February 1965 with funds raised by Korea University students. The stone statue features a tiger seated atop a globe, symbolizing the KU community's aspiration to lead and inspire the world

In June 1961 the present Liberal Arts building (Seokwan) was completed. Various facilities were also completed such as the museum, the agriculture laboratory, the greenhouse, and other buildings for student services. In the same year, an experimental farm of about 1,680,000 pyeong was added to the facilities. In addition, the Science and Engineering Departments were equipped with laboratories and instruments. In December 1963, the Graduate School of Business Administration, the first of its kind in Korea, was established. In October 1965, Yu Chin-O retired after fifteen years of service as the fourth president of Korea University and was succeeded by Lee Chong-Woo as the fifth president. After 1966, Korea University continued to expand with a gradual increase in the number of departments within the College of Science and Engineering and in the College of Agriculture. The Graduate School of Education was also founded. More facilities, including the new annex buildings, the General Education Building (Kyoyangkwan), and the Mass Communication Building (Hongbokwan), were added.

In October 1970, Kim Sang-Hyup, professor of political science, was appointed as the sixth president, succeeding Lee Chong-Woo who retired in September of that year. In December 1971, a major reorganization of Korea University took place, all Woosuk University colleges, including Medicine, Liberal Arts, and Sciences, Law and Economics, Junior College of Allied Health Sciences, as well as Woosuk University Hospital, was completely integrated into Korea University. In June 1972, the Business Administration Building (Kyoyangkwan) was completed to accommodate the College of Commerce and the Graduate School of Business Administration. In December of the same year, the college of Education was established.

=== Growth and Development ===
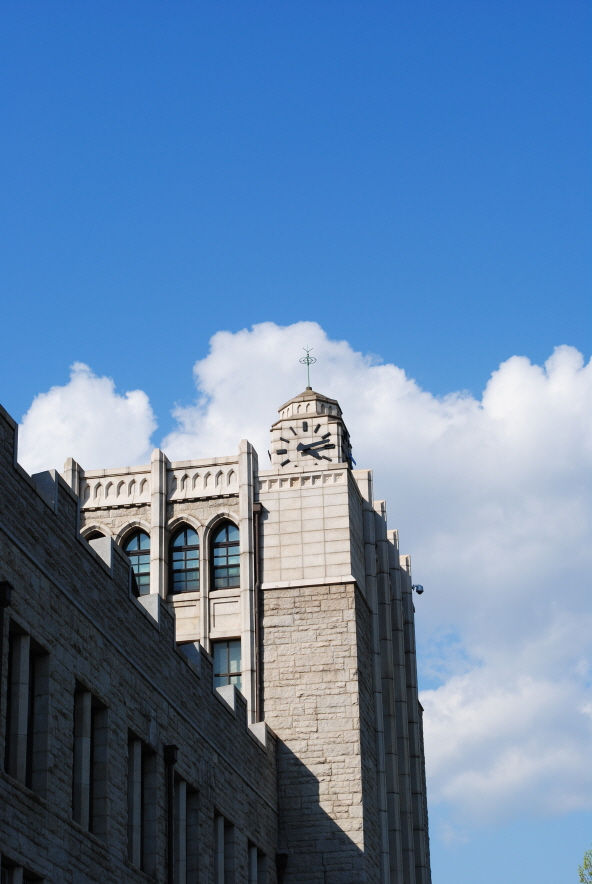
Clock Tower of Korea University at the West Building of the College of Liberal Arts

In April 1975, President Kim Sang-Hyup was succeeded by Cha Rak-Hoon who became the seventh president. In December 1976, the college of Commerce was renamed the college of Business Administration. The Graduate School of Food and Agriculture was established in January of the following year. In December 1977, the College of Science and Engineering was separated into the College of Science and the College of Engineering. In addition, the new Central Library, the largest of its kind in South Korea at that time, was opened in March 1978.

In 1980, Korea University received approval to establish a branch campus in Jochiwon with eight departments to accommodate 400 students, and the university dormitory welcomed its first residents. Later that year, new departments were approved under the College of Agriculture, Education, and Liberal Arts on the Jochiwon Campus. Total enrollment for 1981 was adjusted to 5,600. The Ice Hockey Training Center was built in late 1980. In 1981, the Institute of Viral Diseases was designated a WHO Research Collaborative Institution, and two education halls were built on the Jochiwon Campus. The Department of Public Administration moved from the College of Law to the College of Political Science and Economics, and the Aegineung Student Union Building was completed. In 1982, Kim Jun-yeop became the 9th president and Kim Sang-hyup honorary president.

New departments in Japanese Linguistics, Spanish Linguistics, and Public Administration on the Jochiwon Campus were approved, with total enrollment for 1983 set at 5,681 students. Kim Sang-man became the 5th chairman of the Korea University Foundation.In July 1983, the Medical School and hospital were expanded and reorganized into the Korea University Medical Center, which then included four new hospitals: Haewha, Guro, Yeoju, and Ansan. In September 1983, the Science Library opened as the Center for Science and Technology Research and was at that time the largest and most modern building on campus. New departments in Genetic Engineering, Computing Science, and History Education were established; the Department of Electronic Engineering was renamed. In 1984, new buildings for the College of Law and Political Science and Economics were constructed, along with the founding of the Research Institute of Sport Science.

In 1985, Lee Jun-beom became the 10th president, Bahnwol Hospital opened, the 80th anniversary was celebrated, and the Sports & Recreation Center and Naksan Training Institute were established. In 1986, new departments in Classical Chinese, Computation, and Biological Engineering opened on the Jochiwon Campus alongside the Sports Science Hall and the Graduate School of Policy Science. The Jochiwon Campus was renamed Seochang Campus in 1987, and the Graduate School of Industrial Science was founded. The tomb of Inchon Kim Sung-su was relocated to Namyangju. In 1988, the Peace and Democracy Institute and the Institute of Public Administration were founded; a vice president for the Seochang Campus was appointed; new education halls and departments across multiple fields were added; and departments on the Jochiwon Campus expanded in sciences and business. In 1989, the Seochang Dormitory and female student dormitory building D were constructed. Lee Jun-beom was inaugurated as the 11th president; the vice president position was restored; the Institute for High Technology Materials and Devices was founded; and Korea University signed a research collaboration agreement with the Korea Institute of Science and Technology (KIST).

=== Advancement and Innovation ===
Between 1990 and 1999, Korea University underwent extensive expansion and reform. Key research institutes were founded including those for ICT, natural sciences, neuroscience, medical law, biotechnology, and North Korean studies. Anam Hospital and multiple dormitories, libraries, and academic halls were built, including the Seochang Library, 4.18 Memorial Hall, and Korean Studies Hall. KU established graduate schools in international studies, journalism, labor, law, health, clinical dentistry, and medical sciences. Numerous departments were renamed or reorganized to reflect emerging academic fields, including environmental engineering, food and resource economics, and life sciences. The Graduate School of International Studies and KU's biotechnology and law programs received government designation. Key academic partnerships were signed with Moscow State, Peking, Fudan, and American universities, and KU joined the Brain Korea 21 program in science and humanities.

In June 2001, Korea University concluded a joint academic program with the University of British Columbia in Canada. The Korea University Lyceum was completed and SK Telecom made a contribution in the same month. In July, the Division of International Studies and the School of Journalism and Mass Communication were founded. In October, Korea University obtained ISO9001 authentication in all educational and administrative areas. In 2005, Korea University celebrated its Centennial Anniversary of Foundation Day, May 5. In March the College of Life Sciences and Biotechnology and the College of Life and Environmental Sciences were integrated into the College of Life Sciences and Biotechnology. At the same time, the Junior College of Health Sciences was abolished and merged into the new highly developed College of Health Sciences.

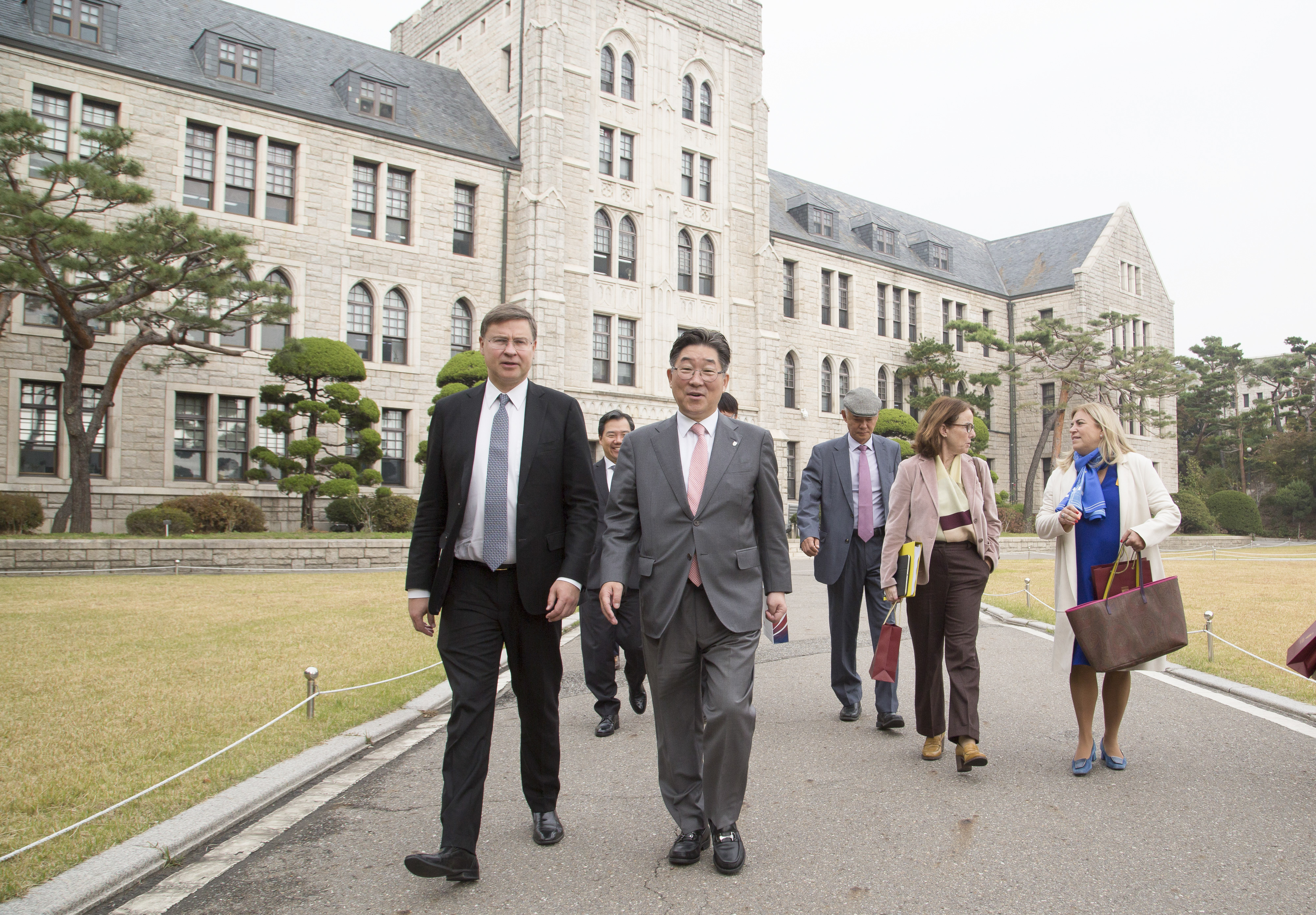
President of Korea University, Kim Dong-one, meeting the member of the European Commission, and former European Commissioner for Trade, Valdis Dombrovskis, 2023

Korea University celebrated its 120th anniversary and hired Kim Dong-One as the 21st president of the university. It got its archives included in UNESCO's Memory of the World Register and completed the construction of the new Anam Hospital Medicomplex. It also reinstated merit scholarships.

== Campus ==
The Seoul Campus of Korea University is located in the Seongbuk District of Seoul. It has a total area of 946,177 sq. meters, or approximately 94 hectares. The campus is divided into three different areas: Humanities and Social Sciences, Natural Sciences, and a Green Campus, which all span through Anam-dong and Jongam-dong neighborhoods.

=== Humanities and Social Sciences ===
Korea University's Humanities and Social Sciences Campus is located in Seongbuk District, covering the areas of Anam-dong and Jongam-dong. It serves as the base for a range of academic departments, such as the Graduate School of Law, Business School, College of Liberal Arts, College of Political Science and Economics, and College of Education. The campus also hosts the College of Media, College of International Studies, School of Design and Art, School of Psychology, and the Department of Free Majors. The campus is distinguished by its architectural style, which prominently features stone construction across several main buildings such as the Centennial Memorial Hall, Central Library, International Studies Hall, Inchon Memorial Hall, SK Future Hall, LG-POSCO Building, and the Main and West Buildings. These structures create a cohesive, fortress-like aesthetic that draws inspiration from European collegiate architecture.

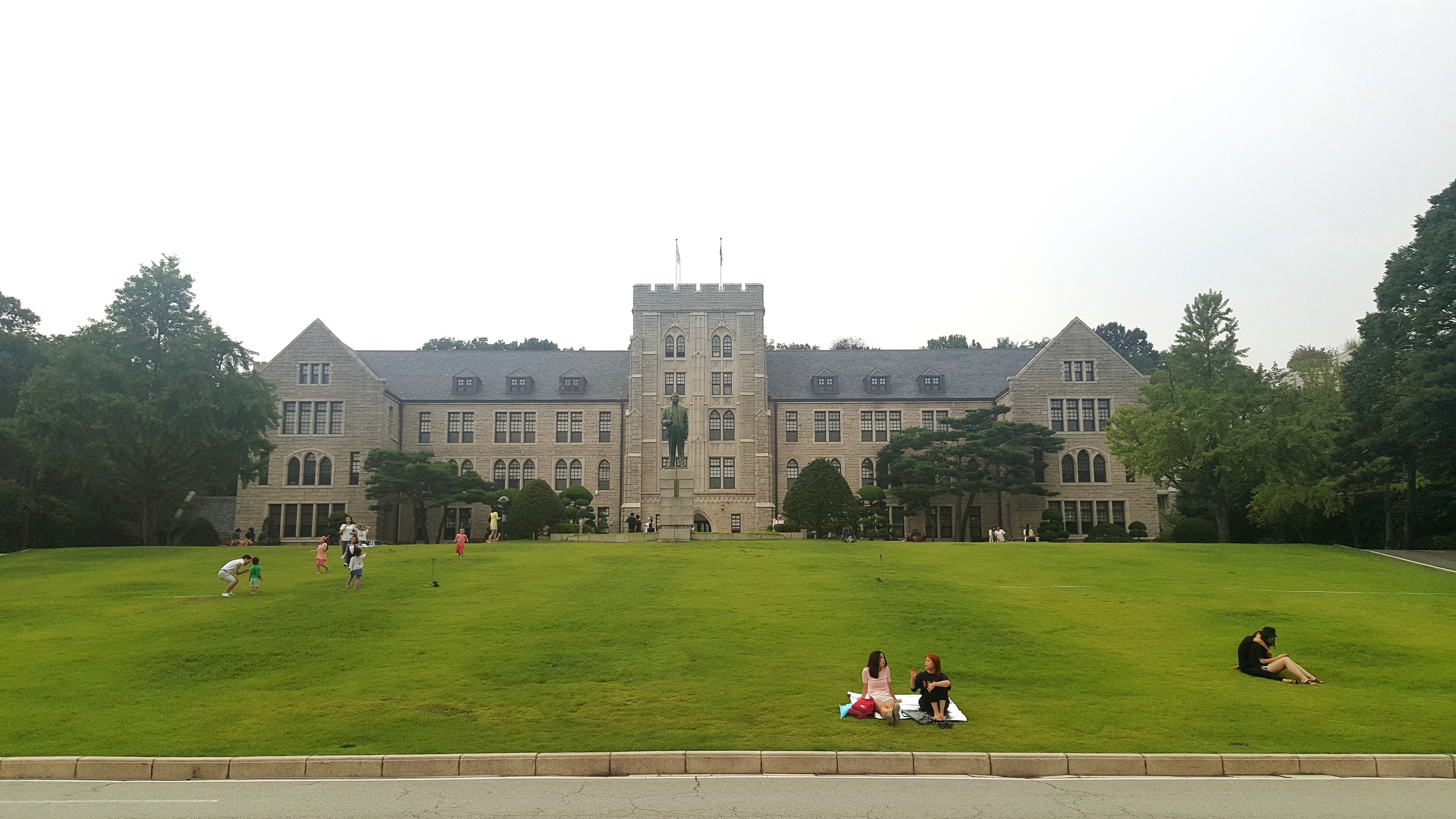
Main Building and the statue of Lee Yong-Ik, seen from the Central Square

Central Square, or Central Plaza, features an above-ground plaza with three subterranean floors, covering a total floor area of 38,907 square meters (11,769 pyeong). Construction began on June 30, 1999, and was completed on March 5, 2002, as part of three master plans commemorating the university's centennial. The plaza serves as a central hub on campus, facilitating dynamic social interaction and access for all university members. Facilities within include reading rooms, the CJ Creative Library (CCL), One-Stop Service Center, Global Service Center, Social Service Organization, KU Pride Club Lounge, Health Center, Student Counseling Center, administrative offices, various welfare facilities, and an underground parking garage. The subterranean levels of Central Plaza are interconnected with those of SK Future Hall, Centennial Memorial Samsung Hall, and LG-POSCO Hall. Adjacent to the plaza stands the Main Building. The six-story Gothic stone structure, designed by Dong-jin Park during the Japanese colonial period, was completed on August 31, 1934. The building was originally used as classrooms. Now it houses the President's Office and several administrative departments. The Main Building has historical and architectural value and as a result has been designated as Historic Site No. 285, and it is protected as a Historical Landmark.

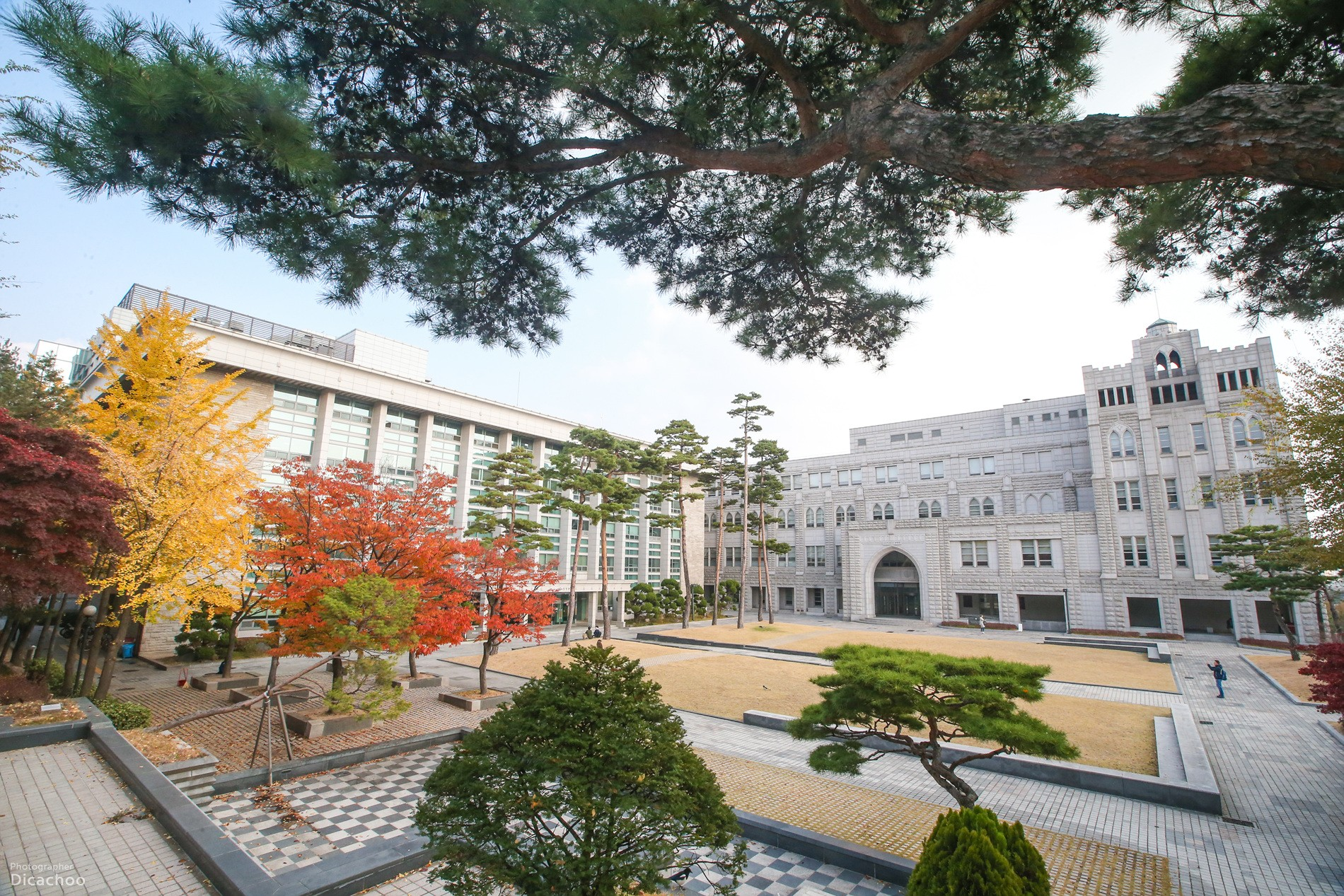
LG-POSCO Building

The business section is located in the eastern section of the zone, whose facilities are clustered within walking distance. At the core is the LG-POSCO Building, which opened its doors in 2005 to celebrate Korea University's centennial, that was completed in 2003. The structure fosters research, collaboration between academia and industry, and international partnerships through the T.I.G.E.R.S. framework (Technical, Industry, Entrepreneur, Research, and Service Leadership). Spanning six stories and covering 14,121 square meters, it houses lecture rooms, faculty offices, Supex Hall, and the Sudang Digital Library. Located on the fourth floor, Supex Hall is equipped for lectures and events, featuring advanced sound systems and simultaneous translation capabilities. In addition, the Sudang Digital Library offers extensive business resources including the Bloomberg terminal which enables the observing of global markets. Standing next to the LG-POSCO Building is the KUBS Main Building, built in 1972. Completing the KUBS complex is Hyundai Motor Hall, which opened in September 2013 as the third major facility for the Korea University Business School. It has five above-ground floors and four underground levels, totaling 15,470 square meters. The facility includes 28 faculty offices, 16 technologically equipped lecture rooms, and 51 group study rooms. Funding for Hyundai Motor Hall came from over 3,600 donors between 2009 and 2013. Lee Du-Hui, former KUBS Dean, highlighted the building's role in enhancing the school's global standing and influence in Asia.

Korea University Library, founded alongside the university in 1905, is one of South Korea's largest academic libraries. It has the largest collections in the world on the Korean language and an extensive collection of approximately 3.8 million books, over 1 million digital content materials, and an extensive collection of about 100,000 rare and special collections. As a provider of knowledge and research, the Korea University Library is part of the Korea University Library System, which subsequently, has specialized branch libraries to appropriately service various aspects of academic The Korea University Library System has major branches including the; Haesong Law Library which possesses the largest legal collection among Korean law libraries; the Centennial Digital Library which has been historically supportive of the university's digital research ambitions; the Science Library which possesses approximately 330,000 volumes related to the disciplines of engineering, medicine, and the natural sciences; and the Graduate School Library which was built in 1937 to commemorate the 30th anniversary of Bosung College and designated as Historic Site No. 286. The Korea University Library applies technologies such as the RFID System Network which provides the seamless ability to access physical materials while on campus. The Library's Scholarly Information Curation Service (SICS) provides online access to academic information. Additionally, the library also provides spaces for reading, creative work, and collaboration.

Founded in 1934, the Korea University Museum houses approximately 100,000 artifacts spanning archaeology, history, folklore, art, the university's own history, and modern historical items. The museum currently features seven permanent exhibition halls, including the Centennial Exhibition Hall, History and Folklore Exhibition Hall, and the Contemporary and Modern Art Exhibition Hall. Among its collections, the museum preserves significant national cultural assets such as three designated national treasures: the Honcheonsigye (a celestial globe clock), Donggwoldo (a 19th-century painting depicting Changdeokgung and Changgyeonggung palaces), and the Buncheongjainhwamuntaehangari (a celadon jar used to store royal placentas during the Joseon dynasty). Additionally, it holds four other treasures and the first draft of Korea's inaugural constitution, authored by Yu Jin-oh, recognized as the nation's most important recorded document. The museum also showcases high-quality works ranging from classical paintings by artists such as Kim Hong-do, Jeong Seon, and Jang Seung-eop to modern artworks by Lee Jung-seob, Park Soo-keun, and Kwon Jin-kyu.

The Centennial Memorial Samsung Hall of Korea University is a multi-functional complex that brings together a museum and a digital library. Completed in commemoration of KU's centennial, the building houses both a digital library and a number of national treasure-level cultural properties. Although both functions are housed in the same building, their entrances and user groups are fully separated. The museum, which is open to the public, is at the front of the building. The digital library, which is for students only, is located at the back of the building near the Library Complex and Graduate School.

Media Hall serves as the home of College of Media & Communication. The building has 12 above-ground floors and 2 subterranean levels, completed on August 31, 2011, with a total floor area of 11,663 m^{2}. The two underground floors house the Media Creators Bunker (MCB), including TV studios, the student broadcasting organization, Educational Media Support Department, student council office, club rooms, classrooms, and seminar spaces. Floors 1 through 6 primarily accommodate the School of Media & Communication and the Graduate School of Journalism & Mass Communication, offering lounges, reading rooms, cafés, administrative and faculty offices, research centers, classrooms, seminar rooms, and KU Cinema TRAP. The KU Cinema TRAP, originally an independent and art film theater on the 4th floor, is now mainly used for large lectures and events. Floors 7 to 10 are mainly dedicated to the School of Art & Design, featuring studios, seminar rooms, training rooms, administrative and faculty offices, and classrooms. The 11th floor houses the Center for Teaching and Learning, while the 12th floor contains the Crimson Lounge.

=== Natural Sciences ===
The Natural Sciences Campus, houses Korea University's science and engineering-related academic units. In contrast to the stone architecture of the Humanities Campus, the Natural Sciences Campus consists of modern buildings. It includes the College of Science, College of Life Sciences, College of Engineering, College of Information and Communication, and College of Health Sciences, as well as departments focused on emerging interdisciplinary fields such as Smart Security and Smart Mobility. The campus serves as a base for Korea University's science and technology-related instruction and research activities, and it is integrated into the wider Anam commercial and student residential area.

Hana Square is located at the centre of the campus. It is a multi-purpose facility completed on August 28, 2006, featuring three underground floors and one above-ground floor, with a total floor area of 28,155 square meters (8,517 pyeong). The name "Hana", meaning "one" or "unity", was chosen via a student competition to represent a unified campus space. It also acknowledges the financial support of Hana Bank, which donated KRW 13 billion toward construction. Designed with sustainability in mind, the building incorporates a double-skinned ceiling to reduce heating and cooling loads, while sunken areas bring natural light to the subterranean levels. The eco-friendly design earned it the Grand Prize at the 2007 Korean Architecture Awards. The facility includes classrooms, seminar rooms, reading rooms (including spaces for laptop users), a fitness center, book and stationery store, cafes, a health center, a one-stop service center, parking, and an adjacent park.

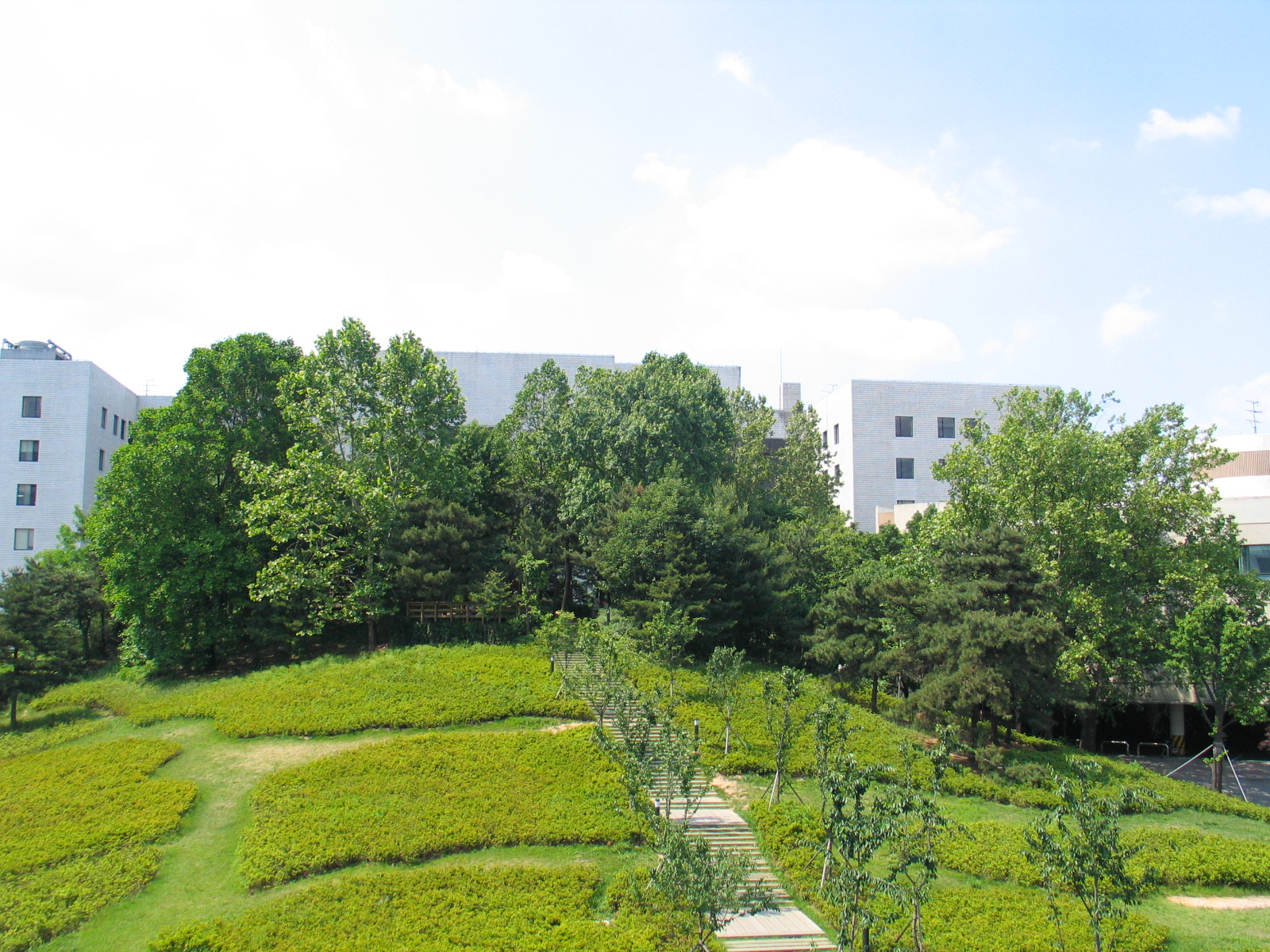
Aegineung, with the Science Library behind

Situated near the Science Library, Aegineung is a symbolic green space at the heart of Korea University's Natural Sciences Campus, often referred to as the Aegyeong Campus due to its presence. The park is located on top of a low hill where the Inmyeongwon Site, the original burial site of Wonbin Hong, a concubine of Joseon Dynasty's King Jeongjo, once stood. Although her remains were relocated to Seosamneung in Goyang, the historical site is preserved, and related relics can be seen at the Korea University Museum. Cherry blossoms are also prevalent on the park.

=== Green Campus ===
The Green Campus functions as Korea University's primary site for health and medical sciences. It is home to the College of Medicine and the College of Nursing, both of which trace their institutional origins to the former Woosuk University College of Medicine (previously known as Capital University College of Medicine). The associated hospital, originally located in Hyehwa, was relocated to Anam in 1991 following the construction of Korea University Anam Hospital. The Green Campus was conceptualized in 1969, with a master plan published in 1986. Initial plans included facilities such as an art college, music college, outdoor swimming pool, and guesthouse. The campus is located on sloped terrain.

With the opening as Kyoung-sung Women's Medical College in 1938, the university's college of medicine was later renamed and annexed as Seoul Women's Medical College in 1948. Then, in 1967, it was renamed as Woosuk College of Medicine. Finally, the medical school merged with Korea University in 1971, and was officially renamed as Korea University College of Medicine. In 1983, the Korea University Medical Center (KUMC) was formed and its first director was inaugurated. Since then, KUMC has been performing the duties as a university hospital, such as education, research, patient care, and voluntary work in world-disaster areas as well as disadvantaged areas in South Korea. Korea University Medical Center is a comprehensive medical institution that includes three hospitals (Anam, Guro, and Ansan), the College of Medicine, three graduate schools, ten laboratories, and several specialized centers. It also has acquired JCI certification, the second medical center in South Korea to do so.

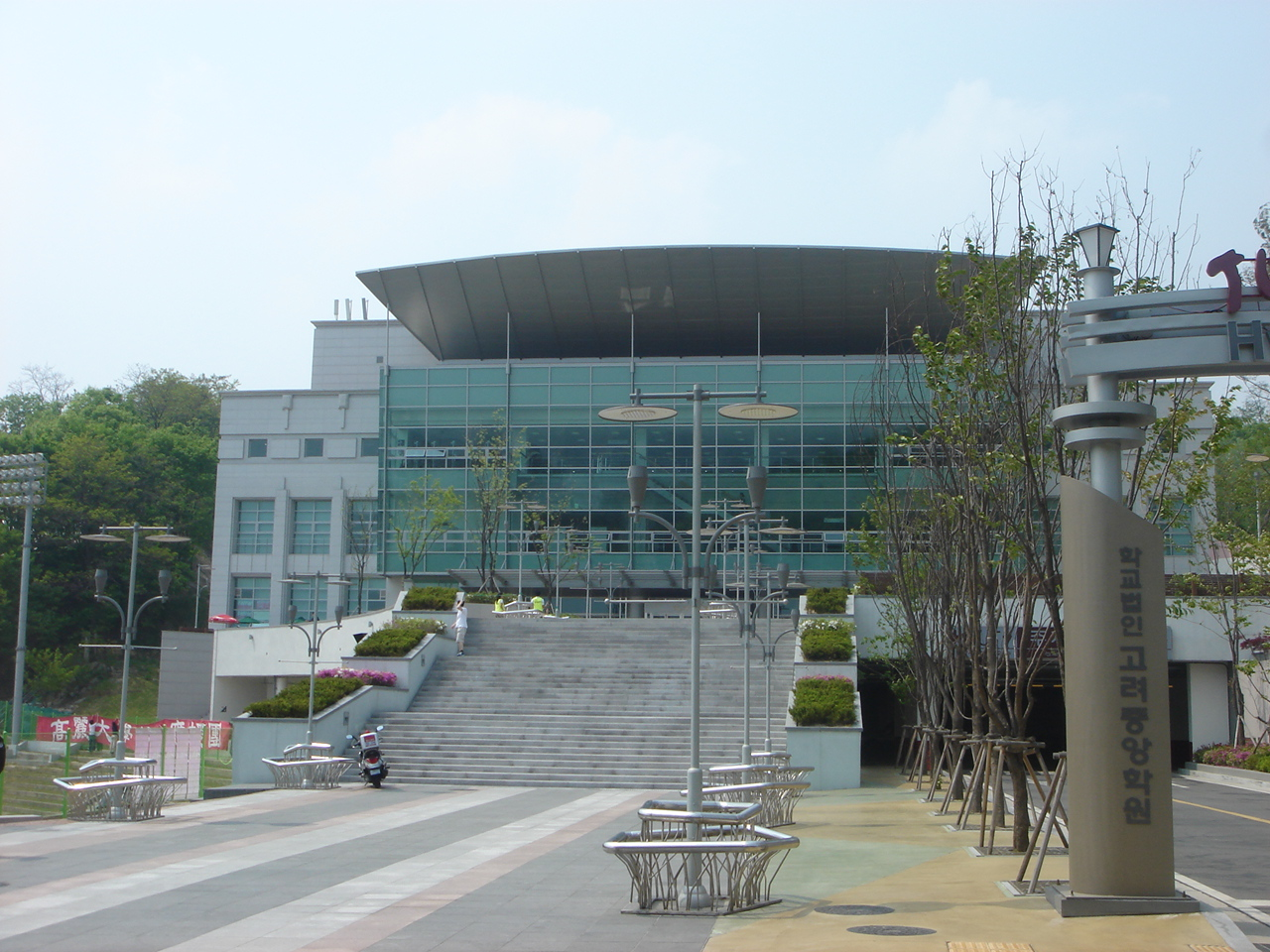
View of the Hwajeong Gymnasium

Located near the Student Dormitory Complex, the Nokgee Sports Facilities, which include the stadium, the track, and the basketball courts, is the Hwajeong Gymnasium, also known as the Tiger Dome. It is a multi-purpose sports complex. Hwajeong Gymnasium is also close to the College of Nursing. Hwajeong's facilities include the Badminton Court, Fitness Center, Assistant Stadium, Squash Court, Aerobics room Rock Climbing, and Lockers. It serves as the home stadium for the Korea University basketball team. Constructed to commemorate the 100th anniversary of Korea University's founding, the gymnasium was built on the former site of the university's open-air theater.

Completed on November 13, 1996, the Techno Complex is a ten-story building with seven above-ground floors and three subterranean levels, covering a total floor area of 23,016 m^{2} (6,962 pyeong). It houses various facilities, including rental office spaces, a videoconference room, a cafeteria, and key organizational units such as the Korea University Research and Business Foundation (Anam Campus Branch), the Department of Planning and Management of Korea Techno Complex, and Korea University Holdings.

The College of Science Building was completed on October 15, 1996, and underwent remodeling in January 2012. It consists of six above-ground floors and one subterranean level. The building houses the College of Science's administrative offices, faculty offices, classrooms, and a wide range of specialized facilities, including laboratories, seminar rooms, training areas, equipment rooms, study carrels, and student lounges. It also accommodates several research organizations, most notably the Institute for Basic Science and the Korea University Research Institute for Natural Science. Planning for the building began in the early 1980s as part of Korea University's long-term development initiative. The project was made possible through the generous support of Chung Ju-yung, the late founder and Honorary Chairman of the Hyundai Group. A Korea University alumnus who had once worked on the construction of the Main Hall as a laborer.

=== Housing ===
Korea University provides a range of on-campus housing options primarily clustered near Gaeunsa-gil, forming a small but dense residential complex. The area is often likened to an apartment village, with several dormitory buildings lining a steadily uphill road near Bugaksan. The residential area is generally divided into several types of dormitories, each differing in operation and facility standards. These include the Student Dormitory (often referred to as the old dormitory), the Frontier Hall (new dormitory), the Gosi Building, and dedicated housing for international students. Each dorm varies in its selection process and living environment. The Korea University dormitories are collectively referred to as "Anam Dormitory."

For incoming freshmen, dormitory placement is determined based on admission scores for older buildings, and by distance from home for the newer Frontier Hall. However, due to limited capacity, many students, especially first-years, may not receive placement and instead seek off-campus alternatives such as boarding houses or rented apartments. Returning students can reapply for housing, but applications are only open to current or previous residents. Re-entry decisions are based on previous semester grades. As students advance through their academic years, the number of applicants typically declines, resulting in higher grade cutoffs, especially noticeable in the spring semester. Remaining seat applications are opened for both students who did not apply for re-entry and those who were not initially selected. For international residents, Korea University offers dedicated housing in the CJ International House, the Anam Global House, and the Anam International House. The Anam Global House was completed in September 2013, while the more recently built Anam International House opened in 2020.

== Organization ==
=== Colleges and schools ===
Korea University's 69 academic departments and programs are organized into 27 colleges and schools:

- Law School
- Business School
- College of Liberal Arts
- College of Life Sciences and Biotechnology
- College of Political Science and Economics
- College of Science
- College of Engineering
- College of Medicine
- College of Education
- College of Nursing
- College of Informatics
- College of Health Science
- College of International Studies
- College of Media and Communication
- School of Art and Design
- Mechatronics
- School of Interdisciplinary Studies
- Division of Smart Security
- School of Psychology
- School of Smart Mobility
- College of Scienece and Technology
- College of Pharmacy
- College of Global Business
- College of Public Policy
- College of Culture and Sports
- Division of Smart Cities

=== Departments and Programs ===
- Law
- Business Administration
- Korean Language and Literature
- Philosophy
- Korean History
- History
- Psychology
- Sociology
- Classical Chinese
- English Language and Literature
- German Language and Literature
- French Language and Literature
- Chinese Language and Literature
- Russian Language and Literature
- Japanese Language and Literature
- Spanish Language and Literature
- Linguistics
- Life Sciences
- Biotechnology
- Food Bioscience and Technology
- Environmental Science and Ecological Engineering
- Food and Resource Economics
- Political Science and International Relations
- Economics
- Statistics
- Public Administration
- Mathematics
- Physics
- Chemistry
- Artificial Intelligence
- Earth and Environmental Science
- Materials Science and Engineering
- Chemical Engineering and Biological engineering
- Civil, Environmental and Architectural engineering
- Architecture
- Mechanical Engineering
- Semiconductor Engineering
- Integrative Energy Engineering
- Industrial Management Engineering
- Communications Engineering
- Electrical Engineering
- Data Science
- Medical Science
- Education
- Physical Education
- Home Economics Education
- Mathematics Education
- Korean Language Education
- English Language Education
- Geography Education
- History Education
- Korean Studies
- Nursing
- Biomedical Engineering
- Biosystem and Biomedical Science
- Health and Environmental Science
- Health Policy and Management
- Computer Science and Engineering
- Cyber Defense
- Smart Security
- Art and Design
- International Studies
- Media and Communication
- Smart Mobility
- Interdisciplinary Studies
- Global Entertainment

=== Interdisciplinary Programs ===
- Science and Technology Studies
- Liberal Arts and Law
- EML (Emerging Market & Latin America) Program
- Language, Brain & Computer
- Humanities and Creative Industry
- Global Leader for the East Asian Century
- Ecologic landscape
- Climate Change Program
- Medical Science and Engineering
- Financial Engineering
- Law and Public Administration
- PEL(Politics, Economics and Law)
- Cryptology
- Fashion Design and Merchandising
- Multicultural Korean Education
- Brain and Cognitive Sciences
- Software Technology & Entrepreneurship Program (STEP)
- Food Industrial Management
- Public Governance and Leadership
- Medical Convergence Engineering
- Convergence Security
- Information Security
- Social Welfare
- DMC (Digital Media Culture)
- Financial Derivatives Engineering
- GKS (Global Korea Scholarship) Major Convergence

=== President's Room ===
The President's Room of Korea University consists of several offices that support the president's administrative, strategic, and oversight functions. These are the Office of the President, the Office of Planning & Budget, the Office of Management Strategy, and the University Audit Team, which includes the Office of Research Audit.

The Office of the President at Korea University serves as the executive center of the university, assisting the president in managing responsibilities across academic, administrative, and external affairs. Operating under the office, the Secretariat is responsible for managing the president's schedule, overseeing internal and external event coordination, handling official protocol for university ceremonies, and producing communications and publications that document the president's activities and public engagements.

The Office of Planning & Budget is tasked with setting the strategic course of Korea University and managing its financial operations. It has three teams: the Planning Team, which creates mid- and long-range institutional plans and plans for policies; the Budget Team, which is responsible for financial planning, budget, and resource allocation; and the Evaluation Team, which carries out performance reviews to encourage institutional effectiveness and continuous improvement.

The Office of Management Strategy is in charge of improving management functions at Korea University. The office is responsible for strategies for operational efficiency, long-term growth of the university, and maintaining institutional competitiveness. It helps the university have a data informed decision making-active organization while supporting functions model that aligns with the strategic objectives set out by the institution.

The University Audit Team serves as an independent body committed to promoting transparency, legal compliance, and accountability throughout Korea University. The team conducts audits at each of the university's central administrative offices, each college and graduate school, and all affiliated and subordinate organizations. The types of audits are administrative audits, financial audits, management consulting, safety audits, and computer audits over research institutes and projects supported by the national treasury. The team provides legal advice, monitor litigation, and work to avoid legal issues, on-campus and off-campus. Located within the audit branch of the University Audit Team, the Office of Research Audit focuses primarily on compliance and transparency related to the university's research environment. The office audits research institutes, studies both spending and revenue and audits financial and management research practices, and is a safeguard for ethical and regulatory research and funding practices.

=== Administration Offices ===
Korea University's administration is organized into several offices and departments. The Office of Academic Affairs includes the Faculty Affairs Team, Educational Affairs Team, and Educational Innovation Team. The Office of Student Affairs oversees the Student Affairs Department, Careers Development Center, One-Stop Service Center, and the Psychological Testing and Counseling Center. The Office of General Affairs manages the General Affairs Department, Human Resources Department, Financial Department, and the Military Affairs Team. The Office of Physical Resources consists of the Purchasing & Property Management Team, Design & Construction Team, Safety Team, and Facility Operation Team. The Office of External Affairs includes the Development Department, Communications Team, Capital Planning Department, and Design Innovation Center. The Office of Digital Information is made up of the Information Development Department, Information Infrastructure Department, Data Hub Team, and Information Strategy Team. The Office of Admissions includes the Office of Admissions, Admissions Planning Team, and the Center for Talented-Student Discovery.

== Academics ==
=== Admissions ===
As one of Korea's prestigious SKY universities, KU's Regular Admission (정시) is fiercely competitive, requiring scores in approximately the top 1% of the CSAT percentile. Admissions are based on the applicant's high school transcripts and scores on the South Korean College Scholastic Ability Test. In 2016, KU's freshman class entering under the regular admission had a 5.13% acceptance rate. For top programs like medicine, business, or engineering, the CSAT cutoff often falls in the high 90s percentile. Regular Admission for most majors is 100% CSAT‑based, though some fields (such as sports or arts) may also require practical exams. Meanwhile, Early Admission (수시) evaluates GPA, school records, essays, interviews, and extracurriculars, with competition ratios reaching 28–30 applicants per seat in sought‑after majors.

Enrollment is divided into standard quota admissions (정원내) and additional categories outside the quota (정원외). Early Admission includes several tracks, such as the School Recommendation Track (학교추천전형), which emphasizes high school grades and requires a nomination from the applicant's school; the Academic Excellence Track (학업우수전형), which evaluates applicants based entirely on submitted documents; and the Aptitude Fit Track (계열적합전형), which combines document review with interviews. Additionally, an Essay-Based Track (논술전형) is available, assessing applicants through a written exam. Certain specialized tracks, such as those for working individuals or underrepresented groups, are also part of the early admission system.

Regular Admission focuses primarily on performance in the College Scholastic Ability Test, with applicants selected based either on CSAT scores alone or in combination with high school academic records. Korea University typically operates within the Group A (가군) of the national university application system. Some academic programs, especially those in emerging and high-demand fields such as Artificial Intelligence, Data Science, Smart Security, and Semiconductor Engineering, offer expanded enrollment and may include contract-based tracks in partnership with leading companies or government institutions. Many tracks require applicants to meet minimum CSAT standards, usually based on performance in Korean, Math, English, and Science or Social Studies (탐구), along with mandatory completion of the Korean History section. The university does not restrict subject selection within Korean and Math, but Science or Social Studies subjects must be drawn from different academic fields to be valid.

From 2022 to 2025, Korea University recorded the highest regular admissions scores among all private universities in South Korea, based on data from Adiga, the official admissions portal of the Korean Council for University Education, and analysis by Jongro Academy. In 2025, the university's average 70th percentile CSAT scores for the general admissions track were 93.16 in the humanities (including interdisciplinary studies and liberal arts) and 93.80 in the natural sciences (excluding medical programs), both ranking first among private universities. When medical programs were included, Korea University still maintained its top position. Korea University led in CSAT-based admissions over four years, with humanities scores of 93.33 in 2022, 94.16 in 2023, 94.21 in 2024, and 93.16 in 2025. Its natural sciences scores were 93.85, 94.92, 94.95, and 93.80 in the same years. Korea University also ranked first nationwide in the 2024 national exams for Foreign Service Officers and Technical Officials. It also ranked first among private universities in the Civil Service Exam and the Legislative Exam.

=== Scholarships ===
Korea University offers scholarships, fellowships and awards under the auspices of the Korea University Foundation, established in 1905. Close to 245 institutional scholarships, totaling more than 11.5 billion won, are available to Korea University students. Almost 90 percent of the admitted international students are awarded Korea University Scholarships. Scholarships are established as either endowed or restricted, in accordance with the wishes of the donor. Scholarships are awarded to students based on criteria such as matriculation status, school and department affiliation, financial need, academic achievement, grade point average and expected graduation date.

=== Rankings and Reputation ===
University rankings
JoongAng National	Domestic	4
QS National	General	3
THE National	General	6
ARWU National	Research	4–6
QS Asia (Asia version)	General	13
THE Asia (Asia version)	General	=27
USNWR Asia	General	67
ARWU World	Research	201–300
QS World	General	61
THE World	General	=156
USNWR World	General	=288

Korea University was ranked 61st in the world in the 2026 QS World University Rankings. In 2016–17, the university was ranked 16th in Asia. In the 2014 QS World University Subject Rankings, the university's politics program, economics program, chemical engineering program, and communications program were all ranked within the top 50 in the world. In 2003, Korea University Law School students accounted for more than 15% of the nearly 900 people who passed the annual Korean bar examination.

The business programs at Korea University obtained international certification by acquiring Association to Advance Collegiate Schools of Business (AACSB) certifications in both undergraduate and graduate levels and European Quality Improvement System (EQUIS). Accordingly, in 2007, the Ministry of Education, after assessing domestic MBA programs, named Korea University as having the MBA program in South Korea. In the 2015 Financial Times' EMBA Rankings, Korea University Business School's Executive MBA (E-MBA) program was ranked 27th in the world.

From 2003 to 2006, Euh Yoon-Dae, the current Chairman of President's Council on National Branding, Steering Committee of Korea Investment Corporation (KIC), and the former (15th) President of Korea University, drastically changed the image of Korea University, a change symbolized by the adoption of red wine over the traditional rice wine. He doubled the publication requirements required for faculty promotion and raised the ratio of the classes taught in English to 35% of all courses taught. He also required that core liberal arts classes be taught by full-time faculty and required every student except those in the Colleges of Engineering, Law, and Medicine to do a double major. He also signed academic exchange agreements with 172 universities overseas and dispatched 60% of administration staff to the world's top 100 universities for training. Korea University also expanded its international-level facilities. It built the Centennial Memorial Samsung Hall, Hwajung Gymnasium, Tiger Plaza, and Hana Square, and also expanded educational and cultural spaces.

=== Research ===
Korea University generates a large amount of research across several academic areas of study, with research expenditures exceeding more than 365 million USD and over 500 million in funding. The university has filed 1,532 patent applications, registered 706 patents, and generated US$2 million in technology transfer fees. Korea University frequently publishes in international journals and engages in research collaborations both domestically and internationally. They have more than 200 research units, and have published over 93,000 research and academic papers. The university has research institutes that focus on artificial intelligence, biotech, engineering, social science, humanities, and operate more than 185 laboratories. They have partnerships with industry and the government for applied research and applied technology development. They have institutes and graduate schools that are heavily research-focused that also enhance their research capacity. The university's research institutes include: Battelle@KU Laboratory, Center for Information Security Technologies, IBS Center for Molecular Spectroscopy and Dynamics - Cho Minhaeng, Choi Wonshik, Ilmin International Relations Institute, Institute of Biotechnology, Korean Language and Culture Center, Research Institute for Information and Communication Technology, and Research Institute of Korean Studies.

=== International Students ===
The overall number of international students is about 6,500. Korea University offers English degree programs in the College of International Studies (CIS) and Graduate School of International Studies (GSIS). International students can also apply toward other degree programs through the Office of International Affairs. However, the language of instruction is usually Korean. In recent years, Korea University has undertaken several initiatives to improve its campus community for international students. Korea University recently established the Global Entertainment Division within the College of Media & Communication to offer practical academic programs centered on Korea's entertainment industry. To enhance student support services, Korea University increased the number of staff fluent in English and Chinese, particularly for international students who may need assistance with the pre- and post-visa question, verification, and process along with career-support counselling. Additionally, the university provides cross-listed courses designed to promote academic interaction and integration between domestic and international students.

In 2024, Korea University President Kim Dong-one announced a new plan to increase the percentage of international students and faculty to 30% in five years, from the 10% and lower percentages currently in 2024. The announcement coincides with Korea University's efforts to increase its global competitiveness and demographics in light of declining domestic students. President Kim emphasized the importance of widening the scope of international students and building relationships with schools in Latin America, Southeast Asia, the Middle East, and Africa. To support this initiative, the university established a globalization task force that has implemented various measures to improve the campus environment for international students. These include the introduction of bilingual signage, halal food options, prayer rooms, AI-assisted lecture subtitles, and regular forums for international students and foreign faculty to discuss their experiences.

== Athletics ==
Korea University is a member of the Korea University Sports Federation (KUSF) and its men's association football, men's basketball, baseball, and men's ice hockey teams participate in the KUSF U-League. Korea University's mascot and symbol is the tiger and its student-athletes are informally known as "Tigers". It has a historic athletic rivalry with the nearby Yonsei University which dates back to the Japanese occupation era. Outside KUSF-sanctioned competitions, both institutions also compete in an annual "friendship games" across two days each fall in five team sports – football, basketball, baseball, ice hockey and rugby – a tradition dating back to the 1940s.

Korea University has been important in developing sports in South Korea. Many of its athletic programs have historical significance, national impact, and have dominated the Korean collegiate athletic scene for a very long time. The football team, created in 1923 during Japanese occupation, helped spur the early growth of modern sports in Korea. It produced key national players, including goalkeeper Hong Duck-Young, who participated in the 1948 Summer Olympics, and several members of the 2002 FIFA World Cup squad such as Hong Myung-Bo, Cha Du-Ri, and Park Chu-Young. The rugby team, founded in 1929, played the first recorded rugby match in Korea. The baseball team was founded in 1948, disbanded during the Korean War, and later revived. It won its first College Baseball Federation title in 1960 and produced notable athletes such as pitcher Sun Dong-Yeol. The basketball team, formed in 1929, won the first Chosun National Basketball Tournament in 1931 and has continued to supply talent to Korean professional basketball. The ice hockey team, established in 1939, gained recognition by winning the college division of the first Ice Hockey League in 1946. Since the construction of an on-campus ice rink in 1998, the program has focused on regaining its competitive standing.

=== Rivalry with Yonsei University ===
The rivalry between Korea University and Yonsei University, the country's top two private schools, regularly gains national attention. There is an annual fall sports festival between the two universities. Since 1956, the annual Korea–Yonsei University Friendship Games comprises five events every year: Football, Rugby, Baseball, Basketball, and Ice Hockey.

The history of the Yonsei–Korea rivalry: Yeonhee College, the forerunner of Yonsei University, and Boseong College, the forerunner of Korea University participated in the fifth Jeonbok. It was the confrontation between the soccer team of Boseong professional school and the soccer team of Yeonhee professional school in the semi-finals of the eighth Jeonbuk Soccer Contest held in Kyungsung Stadium in 1927.

== Student life and culture ==
=== Clubs and Organizations ===
Korea University has student unions and councils that represent student interests and organize campus activities. There are more than 80 clubs and associations run by students on campus, the clubs are organized into 10 categories: Social Science, Exhibition and Creative Art, Social Studies, Art, Religion, Language Studies, Life Culture, Sports, Literary Art, and Science and Technology. Also, there is a Foreign Students' Union that supports international students.

The Social Science category includes clubs such as Philosophy Village, The Wagon Wheel, Saram Saneun Saesang, Study Group of Culture, Working People, KUCC, Economics Institute of Current Events, UNSA (UN Student's Association), Korean Modern History Research Association, Current Affairs & Economy Society, Korean Society Research Association, Korean Spirit Training, and B&B. Exhibition and Creative Art groups include the Institute of Arts Criticism, Our Literature Research Institute, KU Literature Association, Institute of Korean Painting Dolbit (KU Movie Critique Club), Geurim Madang (KU Cartoon Club), Keul Mal Literature Institute (KU poet's society), Hoyounghoi Jinbo Creative Literature Club, and Seowha PAPCON. Social Studies clubs include One, Two, Five (a campaign for the disabled), Red Cross Student's Association, Rotarect (university federation public service club), Nadal Moeum (an agricultural club), Howoo Hwe (a public service club), Eunwhawhe (a student association for night studies), Saebyok Kwangjang (an environmental preservation club), and KUSA.

Artistic organizations include the Korea University Choir (former KU Glee Club), KU Nongak (Korean instrumental music of peasants), KU Orchestra, We Love Tal (Korean Traditional Mask), KU Wind Ensemble, Noraeol Theater, Korean Classical Music Classic Guitar Club, 1905, Crimson, Korea University A Cappella Group LoGS, KUDT (Korea University Dance Team), Geurootogi (an Acoustic Guitar Club), TTP, Bulas (Sports Dance), and TERRA (hip hop). Religious student associations include the Won-Buddhism Student's Association, Every Nation Mission (ENM), Jeung San Do, Student Christian Association, Campus Crusade for Christ (CCC), Korean Christian Students' Union, Christ's Ambassador Mission (CAM) University Mission, Buddhist Student's Association, Joy Mission, Catholic Student's Association, Student For Christ (SFC), and IVF. Language-focused clubs include Nid d'amis (French Club), Dongsuchoi, KU Research Institute on Korean and Japanese Culture, S.I. S TIME, KU China Research Institute, E.C.S (English Conversation Researching Society), LECA (English Conversation Club), and A.L.C.

Life Culture clubs include the Leisure and Recreation Research Association, Youth Hostel (Traveling Club), Ho-Jin Hwe (theatre appreciation and critique club), Scout / Ho-Dong Hwe (a club founded by Japanese Koreans), and Paduk Sarang Meeting (a Korean checkers club). Sports clubs include the Fencing Club, Amateur Soccer Team, Skin Scuba Diving, Korea University Amateur Baseball Club, KU Archery Club, Swimming Tiger's Club, Badminton / Ping-Pong Club, and Soobakdo. Literary arts groups consist of Norae Madang, Talpae Hanaldarae, KU Folk Music Band, Yeol Gu Rim, ICCUS, TERRA, Sun Hyang Jae, and Darkroom. Science and Technology clubs include KULS, KUERA, Amateur Astronomer's Club (KUAAA), Amateur Radio Association (HAM), and Intelligent Robot Club (KAsimov). Other student organizations include Honong-hoe, The Morning Dew, Breaking The Cell, Buddhist Student Society, Sunlight Village, Youth & Future, and Korea University Extreme Sports Club (KESC).

Korea University also features the Center for Human Rights and Gender Equality, which aims to protect students’ human rights, including the right to sexual self-determination, and to prevent and respond to violations. The center offers education on human rights and gender issues, mandatory for students since 2017 and for faculty since 2018. It conducts investigations, provides counseling, and implements follow-up actions including protection of victims and education for perpetrators. The center also manages a Supporters Program, where students promote gender equality and human rights on campus through regular discussions and activities. A separate education and counseling program is offered to individuals found to have violated others' rights, aimed at improving their awareness and preventing recurrence. Additionally, the Student-Human Rights Organization Volunteer Program connects students with local human rights organizations, fostering practical experience and collaboration with the broader community. The center also holds conferences and events with universities around the world in promotion of diversity and inclusion.

=== Traditions ===
The Granite Tower Festival (Seoktap Daedongje) is the biggest and most popular annual event at Korea University. It takes place every year around May 5, which is the university's founding anniversary. The festival began with the first Seoktap Festival on May 5, 1962. During the week-long celebration, students, professors, alumni, parents, and local residents come together to honor the university's founding with various events around campus. All colleges, departments, and student clubs take part, creating a lively atmosphere where students can enjoy both the academic and social sides of university life. Throughout the week, various activities take place, including an academic festival featuring sharp analysis and discussion, a broadcasting festival held in friendly competition with Korea University's longtime rival Yonsei University, and a lively street festival that fills the streets of nearby Chamsal-gil. Each night, around four celebrity performers entertain the crowd in Minju-Gwangjang (민주광장), the plaza in front of Woodang Hall. The festival culminates on the final day with Ipselenti Jiya, the university's most popular cheering festival, where students gather at Nokji Field (녹지운동장) to sing Korea University's cheers, dance, and enjoy performances by Korean artists. April 18 Marathon (418 민주대장정) is a marathon honoring the students who were assaulted in the "April 18th Korea University student assault incident." 3,000 Korea University students gathered on April 18, 1960, in a peaceful demonstration against the rigged presidential election of Syngman Rhee on March 15, demanding rightful democracy. The government mobilized organized gangster groups to forcefully shut down this demonstration, injuring and incarcerating many. Korea University students take great pride in being one of the most active participants in Korean modern history, and the April 18 Marathon is one of the ways in which they honor their seniors who strived for a better future.

Ipselenti - Cry of "Ji Ya" (입실렌티- 지.야의 함성) is a cheering festival that is held by the Korea University Cheerleaders on the last and biggest night of Seoktap Daedongje (Granite Tower University Festival). Students gather in the Nokji Field (녹지운동장) and sing Korea University's cheering songs, dance along and enjoy. Some of the country's best-known singers are also invited to perform there; Blackpink, Twice, Psy, Le Serrafim, TXT, Red Velvet, 2NE1 being some of them. "Ipselenti" is part of Korea University's slogan that has been used since Bosung College, and "Ji" and "Ya" mean jiseong and yaseong (wisdom and wildness).

=== Transportation ===
Korea University is served by a university-operated shuttle on its Seoul campus, running on weekdays during academic semesters. The shuttle connects academic buildings, residence halls, and other campus facilities. The shuttle runs from 7am-4pm on a typical academic day. The campus is accessible via Seoul Subway Line 6 through Anam Station and Korea University Station. Airport Limousine Bus 6102 provides direct service to Incheon International Airport. Additional access is available through transit bus routes.

=== Alma mater ===
Korea University's school song is played daily at nine o'clock in the morning from the clock tower of the College of Liberal Arts building. The song was introduced in May 1955 to commemorate the university's 50th anniversary. The lyrics were written by Ji-Hoon Cho, a KU professor and member of the renowned poet group Cheongnokpa. Cho was also known for his poem Seungmu (Buddhist Dance), which emphasized liberty, justice, and truth, values that represent Korea University's spirit. The music was composed by Isang Yun. To mark the university's 100th anniversary, a melody "Symphony for Liberty, Justice and Truth", composed by Russian composer Alexey Larin for Korea University was incorporated into university celebrations. The composition took approximately two years to complete, including several months spent at Korea University. The symphony was premiered by the Korea University Orchestra, a student ensemble, at the Centennial Anniversary Concert held at the Seoul Arts Center on September 11, 2005.

== Student body ==
Korea University's student body includes individuals of varied backgrounds in race, ethnicity, national origin, gender, sexual orientation, disability status, socioeconomic class, age, values, behavior patterns, religion, and culture. The university formally recognizes these differences and frames diversity as a structural component of its academic and administrative functions.

In 2022, Korea University selected 42 out of 1,109 campus-wide regulations for evaluation to assess compliance with diversity principles. These regulations covered legal, academic, and administrative domains. The review aimed to identify violations of diversity sensitivity and propose corrective revisions.

The university held the Graduate Student Diversity Research Challenge and Symposium under the title "Think Within, Talk Across," promoting research diversification. A monthly booklet, "Diversitas," was published and distributed digitally in English and Chinese under the title "Harmonious Diversity." A talk concert, "A Diverse Harmony," was held at the Tongyeong International Music Festival. The first Diversity Award was held, with recipients including Mohae, a group supporting students with disabilities, the School of Media and Communication, and Professor Lee Jongkoo for research in human-inspired AI. A pilot employee engagement program was launched to promote diversity among staff.

Proposals for 2023 included assigning diversity officers to departments, forming university-wide diversity networks, implementing diversity criteria in admissions and hiring, revising leadership selection processes, expanding diversity elective offerings, and introducing diversity micro-degrees. The university proposed standardized diversity engagement for new students, support systems for minority groups, a diversity fund, expansion of the Diversity Award, and establishment of the Korea University Diversity Archives. It also planned participation in intercollegiate diversity networks and dissemination of its diversity frameworks to other institutions.

== Notable people and alumni ==
In 2009, Korea University claimed approximately 280,000 living alumni. Korea University has had many famous politicians, including the tenth President of the Republic of Korea, Lee Myung Bak, 20th Speaker of the Assembly, Chung Sye-kyun, and the 34th Mayor of Seoul, Oh Se-hoon as alumni. Also, a recent survey of South Korea's Fortune 500 companies revealed that Korea University has produced the greatest number of CEOs of these Fortune 500 companies.

== Korea University Sejong Campus ==
Korea University Sejong Campus
- Type: Private
- Established: 1980; 46 years ago
- Faculty: 262 full-time 361 part-time (2018)
- Students: 7,240 (2018)
- Undergraduates: 6,483 (2018)
- Postgraduates: 757 (2018)
- Location: Sejong, South Korea
- Campus: 105 acres (42 ha); Suburban
- Colors: Crimson
- Mascot: Tiger
- Website: sejong.korea.ac.kr
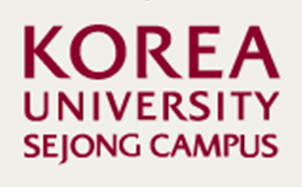

Korean name
- Hangul: 고려대학교 세종캠퍼스
- Hanja: 高麗大學校 世宗캠퍼스
- RR: Goryeo daehakgyo Sejong kaempeoseu
- MR: Koryŏ taehakkyo Sejong k'aemp'ŏsŭ

Korea University Sejong Campus (고려대학교 세종캠퍼스) is Korea University's second campus, located in the planned city and the de facto administrative capital of South Korea, Sejong City. It was established in Jochiwon, Yeongi County (later annexed to Jochiwon District of Sejong City). Korea University's Sejong Campus installation plan was approved on September 22, 1979, and the campus officially opened in 1980. Based on Article 6, Section 1 of Chapter 2 of the university's Regulations, which states that "The university is composed of the Seoul Campus and the Sejong Campus," the second main campus of Korea University is officially recognized as the Sejong Campus. The campuses share student associations and students are free to pursue double majors across both campuses. Korea University Sejong Campus is a leading, research oriented campus. The campus consists of the Biomedical Campus in Osong Bio-health technopolis established by Korea's Ministry of Health & Welfare, New Research Campus (provisional name) in Sejong City, which was established as Korea's new government district (Sejong Special Self-Governing City). Six colleges and schools in Sejong Campus are part of the twenty schools of Korea University.

=== Academics ===
==== Colleges and schools ====
- College of Global Business

- Division of Convergence Business

- College of Public Policy
- College of Science and Technology
- College of Business and Economics
- School of Public Administration
- School of Sports and Leisure Studies
- College of Pharmacy
- Division of Smart Cities

== See also ==
- Association of Pacific Rim Universities
- Education in South Korea
- KU-Yonsei rivalry
- List of universities in Seoul
- List of colleges and universities in South Korea
- List of Korea University people
- SKY Universities
- S3 Asia MBA – Joint MBA program by Fudan University, Korea University and NUS Business School
- Universitas 21
