= Korea University College of Medicine =

- 고려대학교 의과대학/의학전문대학원
- Type: Private
- Established: 1928
- Students: 600 (M.D.)
- Location: Seoul, South Korea
- Website: medicine.korea.ac.kr

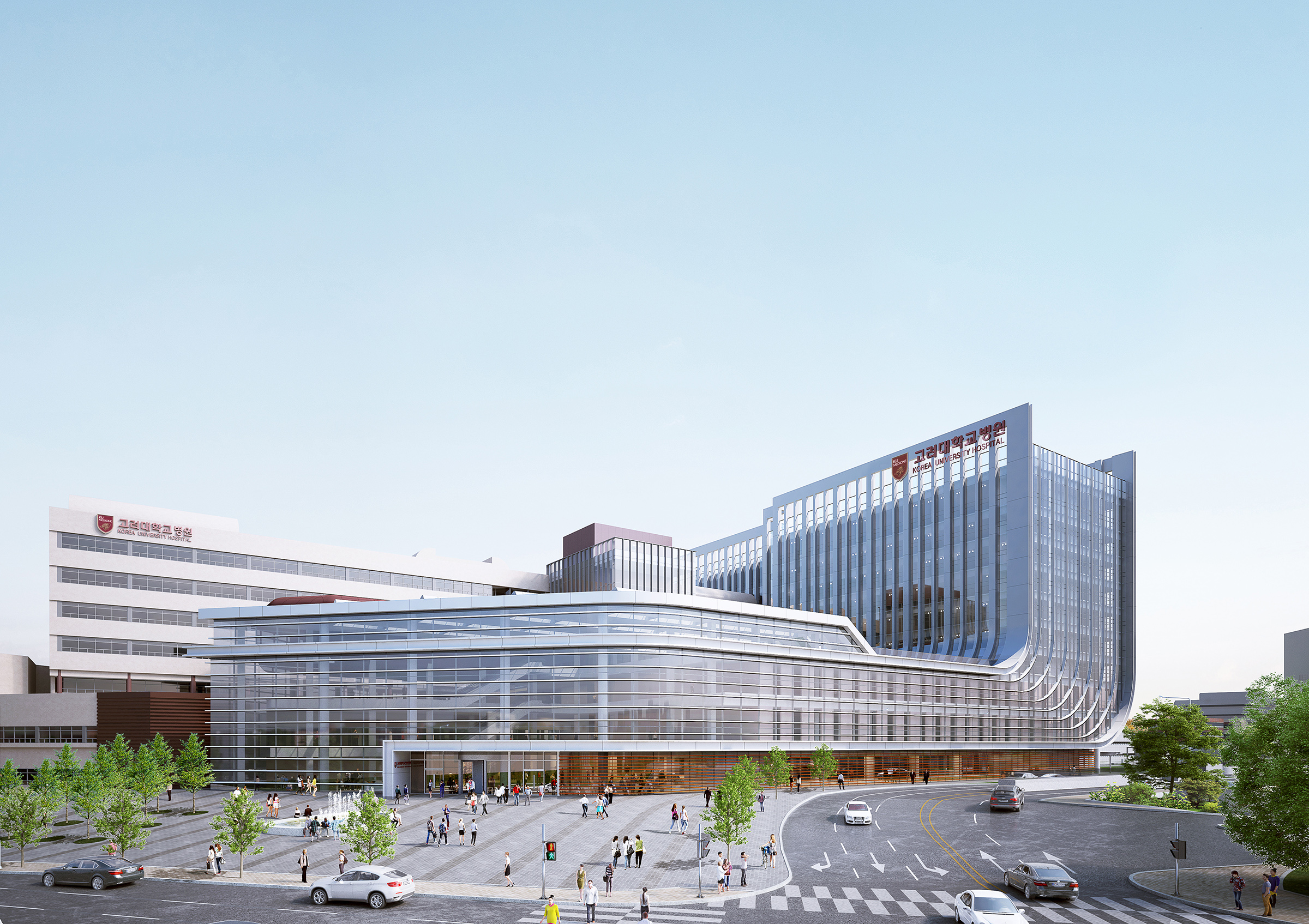
Korea University Medical Center

Korea University College of Medicine is the medical school of Korea University. It is located in Seoul, South Korea. As one of the oldest medical schools in South Korea, it has been historically regarded as one of the country's top medical schools. In 2021, the Korea University Medical Center was ranked as one of the top 100 hospitals in the world by Newsweek magazine.

== History ==
The school was founded as Chosun Women's Medical Training Institute in 1928 by Rosetta Sherwood Hall. The institute was subsequently renamed several times and ultimately merged with Korea University to become Korea University College of Medicine. So far, the school has produced over 7,000 graduates, most of whom are working as prominent physicians and public health advocates worldwide.
